= Morocco–United States relations =

- Morocco: United States

Diplomatic mission
- Embassy of Morocco, Washington, D.C.: Embassy of the US, Rabat

Relations between the Kingdom of Morocco and the United States of America date back to the American Revolutionary War (1775–1783) and specifically since 1777 when Morocco under Sultan Muhammad III became the first country in the world to recognize the independence of the United States. Morocco remains one of America's oldest and closest allies in North Africa and in the Arab world, a status affirmed by Morocco's zero-tolerance policy towards al-Qaeda and their affiliated groups. Morocco also assisted the U.S. Central Intelligence Agency with questioning al-Qaeda members captured in Afghanistan, Iraq, and elsewhere during the administration of President George W. Bush, who designated the country as a major non-NATO ally.

Formal US diplomatic relations with Morocco began in 1787 when the Confederation Congress ratified a Treaty of Peace and Friendship between the two nations, which had been signed earlier in 1786. Although the Sultan of Morocco declared war on the United States in 1802, the treaty was renegotiated in 1836 and is still in force, making it the longest unbroken treaty relationship in the history of the United States. Tangier is home to the oldest U.S. diplomatic property in the world. Now a museum, the Tangier American Legation Museum is also the only building outside of the U.S. that is designated as a National Historic Landmark (Note: Excluding those in the Compact of Free Association.) and the only foreign building to be listed on the National Register of Historic Places. (Note: Excluding those in the Compact of Free Association.)

The US maintains an embassy in Rabat, Morocco. Morocco maintains an embassy in the United States at 1601 21st Street N.W., Washington, D.C. 2009.

== History ==
=== 1777–1787 ===
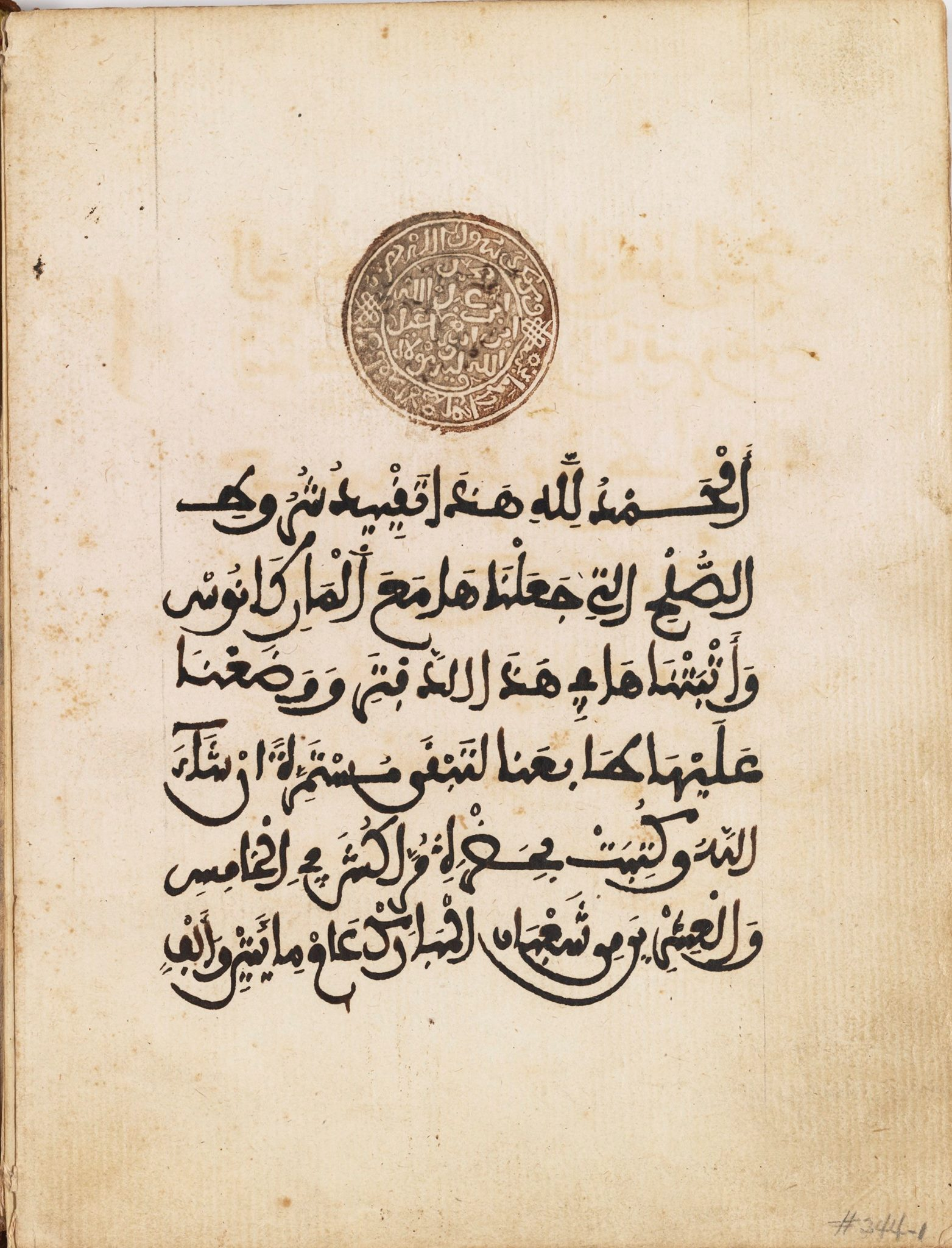
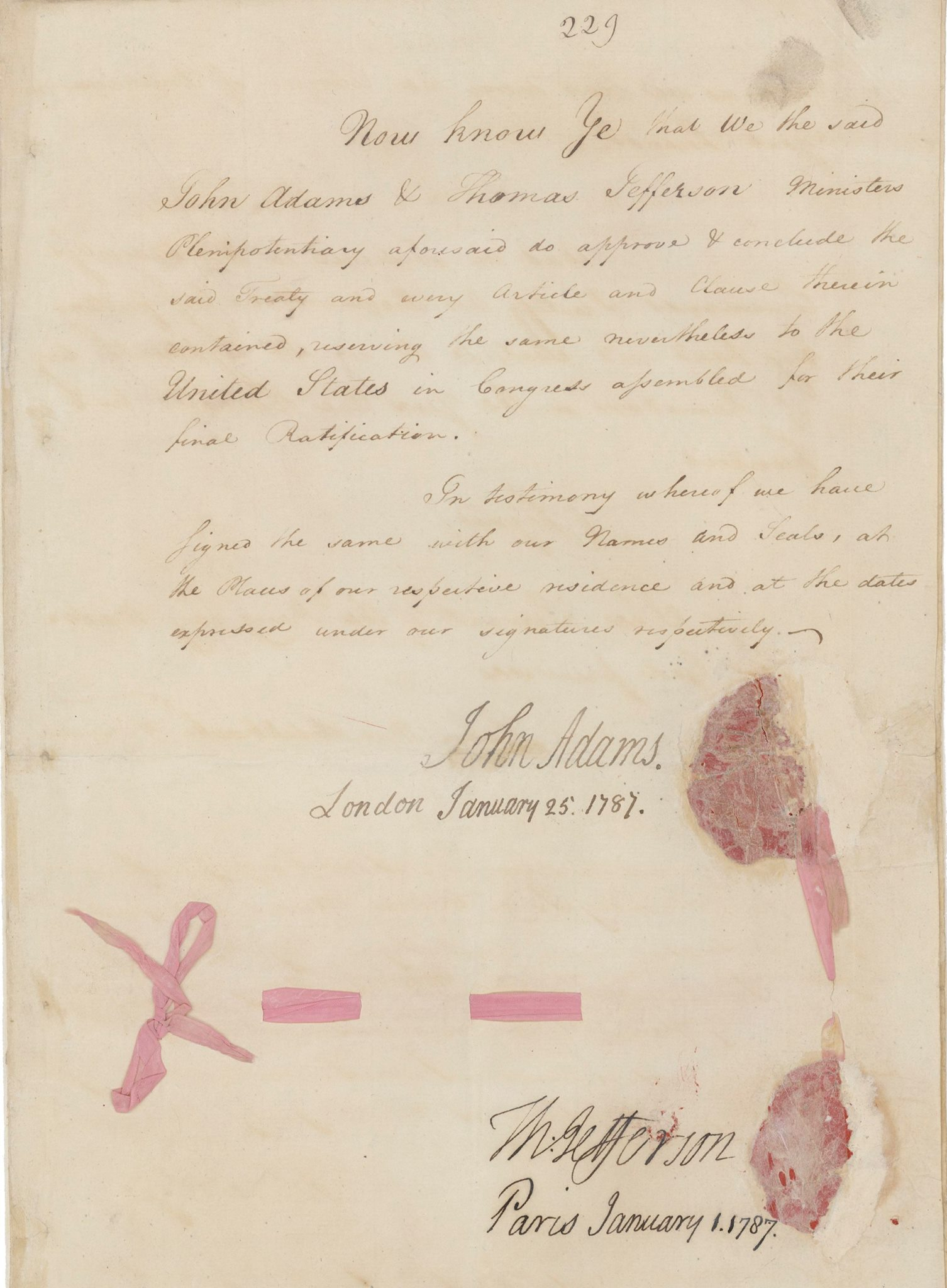
The Moroccan-American Treaty of Friendship of 1787.

On 20 December 1777, Sultan Muhammad III of Morocco commissioned the consul of the Dutch Republic in Salé to write letters to European merchants and consuls in Tangier, Salé, Larache and Mogador stating that vessels sailing under the flag of the United States could enter Morocco's ports, alongside those of European countries with which Morocco had no diplomatic ties, such as the Russian Empire and the Kingdom of Prussia, under the same conditions as those enjoyed by the nations that had treaty relations. Information about the Sultan's desire for friendly relations did not reach Benjamin Franklin, the American emissary to the Kingdom of France in Paris, before April 1778 at the earliest. In 1777, Morocco sought to change its trade relationship with the nascent United States. Sultan Mohammed III actively sought to have an American diplomat negotiate a formal treaty, but meanwhile, Barbary corsairs threatened American merchant shipping in the Mediterranean Sea. Finally, Thomas Barclay, the American consul in France, arrived in Morocco in 1786. There, he negotiated the Moroccan–American Treaty of Friendship with Sidi Muhammad, Sultan of Morocco, which was signed on June 23, 1786.

The Treaty was signed in Europe by American diplomats John Adams and Thomas Jefferson and ratified by the Confederation Congress (under the Articles of Confederation government which preceded the current constitutional government) in July 1787.

One of the many letters between American and Moroccan officials was written by the first U.S. President George Washington to Mohammed III. On December 1, 1789, eight months into his presidency, Washington wrote on his authority and leadership of the United States as well as the miscommunication between Morocco and America. In the letter, Washington expresses his regrets in lack of punctuality but clarifies that the untimely response was due to a change in government and the desire to communicate on solidified terms. Washington also shows appreciation for Mohammed Ibn Abdullah's diplomatic initiative tactics in the protection of American ships from pirates. These actions are appreciated because of the lack of power the United States as a country had held at the moment. Morocco was the first Berber, Arab, African, and Muslim state to sign a treaty with America. America lacked a navy at the time and was unable to defend its ships in the Mediterranean.

=== Abd ar-Rahman ===
In 1826, Sultan Abd ar-Rahman intervened on behalf of Abdul Rahman Ibrahima Sori, a Muslim Fula nobleman enslaved in the US, after having read a letter Sori had sent to his family in Africa. Andrew Jackson capitalized on this event in his campaign against President John Quincy Adams before the presidential elections held in 1828.

=== American Civil War ===
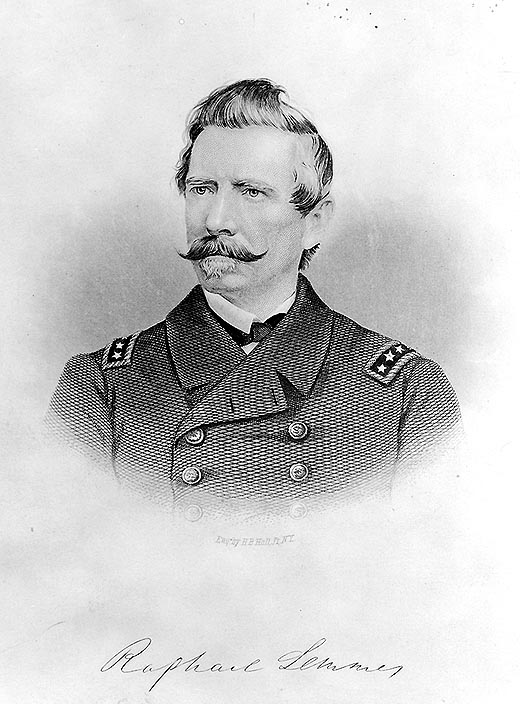
Portrait of Raphael Semmes whose actions precipitated the Tangier Difficulty.

During the American Civil War, Morocco reaffirmed its diplomatic alliance with the United States (Union). Morocco also became the scene of a colorful foreign relations and political warfare episode involving the Kingdom of Morocco, the United States of America, the Confederate States of America, France, and Great Britain.

In 1862, Confederate agents Henry Myers and Thomas Tate Tunstall were arrested by the Moroccan police on orders of US Consul James DeLong. Tunstall and Myers had been dispatched by Confederate naval commander Raphael Semmes to purchase coal for the CSS Sumter, which was docked at Gibraltar. Semmes actively pleaded with the British consul John Drummond Hay to obtain the release of the prisoners, to which Hay responded that he could only convey the message but not offer any recommendation for actions, as offering a recommendation would violate Britain's terms of neutrality. Semmes tried a similar tactic with the French consul, but without success.

Eventually, a crowd of European citizens living in Morocco protested outside the American consulate, demanding the prisoners' release. The US consul was able to obtain Morocco's consent to transfer the prisoners to a US Navy ship, which took them to Fort Warren prison in Boston by way of Cadiz, Spain.

As a result of the affair, Lincoln withdrew consul DeLong. Having been irritated by Morocco's response, the Confederate States were never able to recover and manage relations with Morocco. In 1863, the King of Morocco released an official order stating in part: "... the Confederate States of America are fighting the government with whom we are in friendship and good relations... if any vessel of the so-called Confederate states enters your port, it shall not be received, but you must order it away on pain of seizure; and you will act on this subject in cooperation with the United States...."

During the spring of 1864, the 1862 CSS Georgia, a Confederate screw steamer, arrived off the coast of Mogador as a reprieve from a hard winter's sail. Upon arrival, the crew was able to lower their boats and row towards the shore. Upon landing, the crew was greeted by hostile Moroccans who knew both who they were and that their government was hostile towards them, despite spoken neutrality. The officers were then forced, at gunpoint, back towards the sea and into the boats from which they arrived. Back on the ship, Captain Matthew Fontaine Maury ordered a shot from the Georgia's ten–inch turret gun, followed by a salvo bombardment. No Moroccan casualties were recorded due to their retreat from the shore during the initial shot fired. This marked the only time during the American Civil War that Confederate guns were fired anywhere besides North America.

=== Late 19th and early 20th century ===
At the end of the American Civil War, the first international convention ever signed by the United States, the 1865 Spartel Lighthouse Treaty, dealt with a navigational aid erected on the Moroccan side of the Strait of Gibraltar. The Treaty, which was ratified by Morocco, U.S. President Andrew Johnson, and nine European heads of state, granted neutrality to the lighthouse, with the condition that all ten signatories to the agreement assumed responsibility for its maintenance.

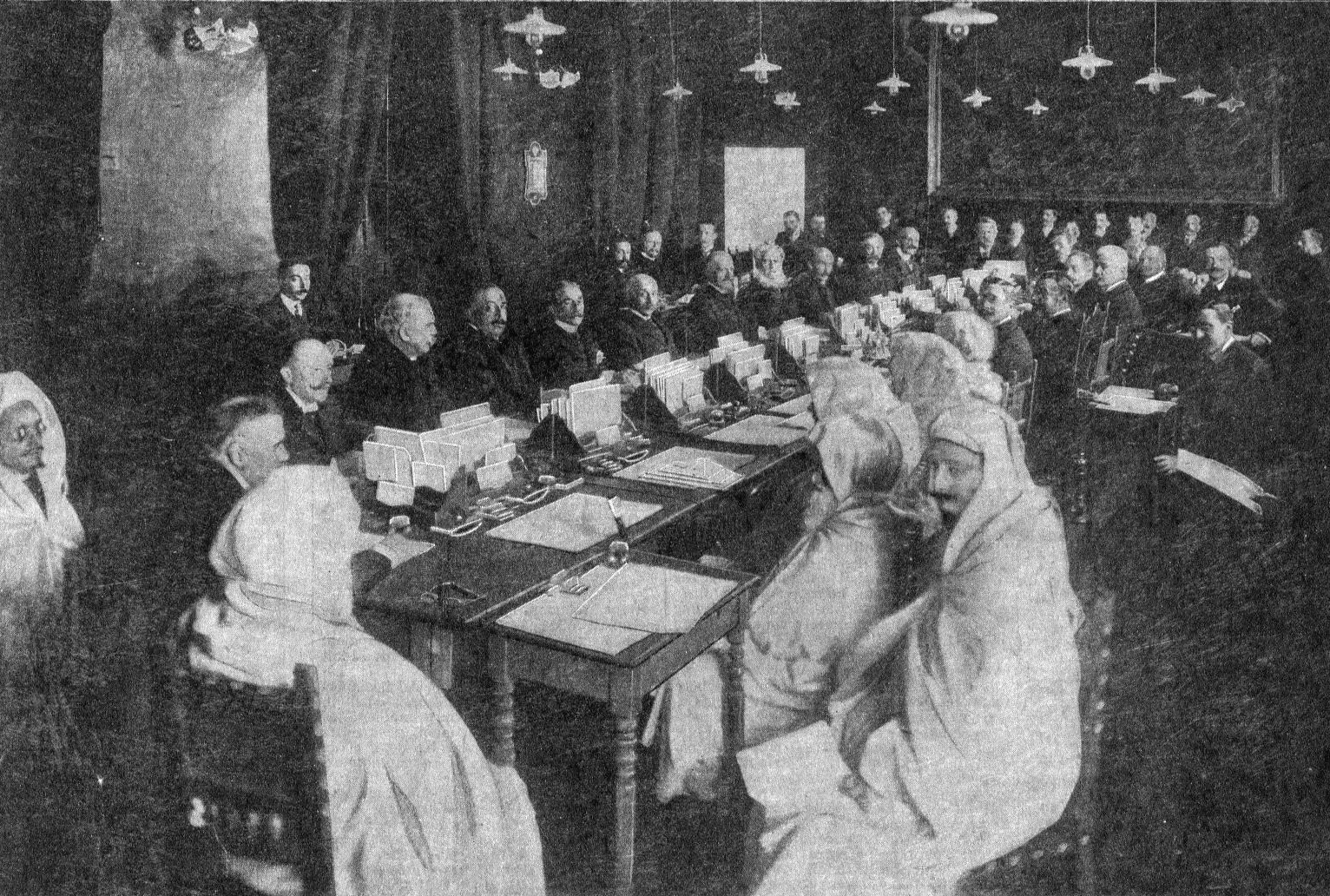
Algeciras Conference

During the First Moroccan Crisis, the United States affirmed the Morocco's right to its continued sovereignty at the Conference of Madrid (1880) and the Treaty of Madrid (1880), and again at the Algeciras Conference in 1906. President Theodore Roosevelt played an important role in settling the affair during the 1906 Algeciras Conference. Elihu Root, his Secretary of State, declared, "Fair play is what the United States asks - for Morocco and for all the interested nations - and it confidently expects that outcome." President Roosevelt offered a compromise plan which the European powers accepted. The proposal granted Morocco a greater deal of autonomy and allowed for all European nations to trade with Morocco.

In 1912, after Morocco became a protectorate of Spain and France, American diplomats called upon the European powers to exercise colonial rule that guaranteed racial and religious tolerance.

=== World War I – World War II ===
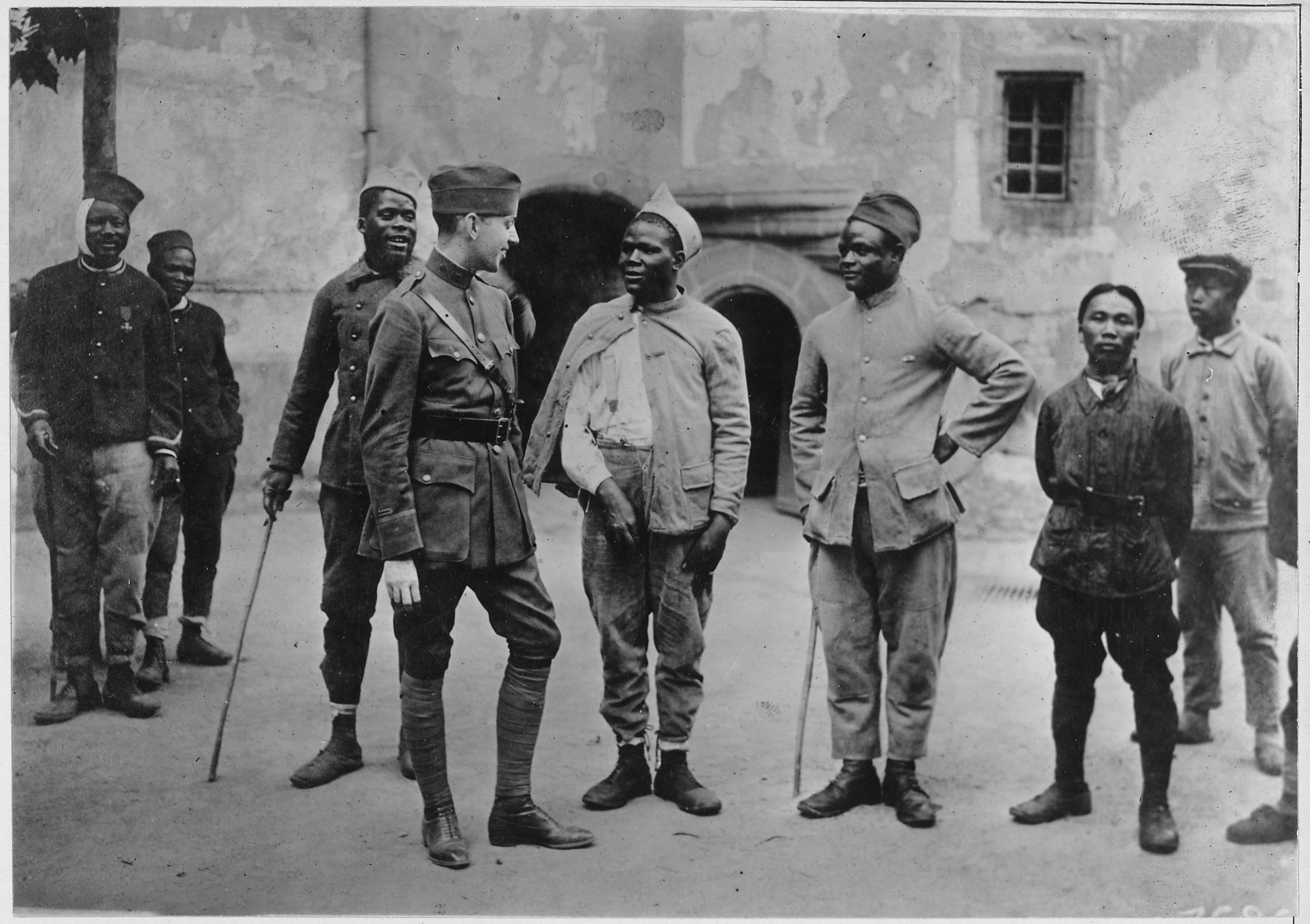
Convalescent Moroccan soldiers telling their war experience to an American Red Cross worker 1917–1919 (National Archives and Records Administration)

During World War I, Morocco was aligned with Allied forces. In 1917 and 1918, Moroccan soldiers fought alongside U.S. Marines at Château-Thierry, Mont Blanc, and Soissons.

Nazi Germany occupied France during World War II, so the French protectorate in Morocco was under the control of Axis powers-aligned Vichy France. When the Allies invaded Morocco on November 8, 1942, as part of Operation Torch, the defenders yielded to British and American forces. Shortly after the surrender and defection of Vichy forces in Morocco, President Franklin D. Roosevelt sent a message to Muhammad V of Morocco, commending him on the "admirable spirit of cooperation that is animating you and your people in their relationships with the forces of my country. Our victory over the Germans will, I know, inaugurate a period of peace and prosperity, during which the Moroccan and French people of North Africa will flourish and thrive in a manner that befits its glorious past."

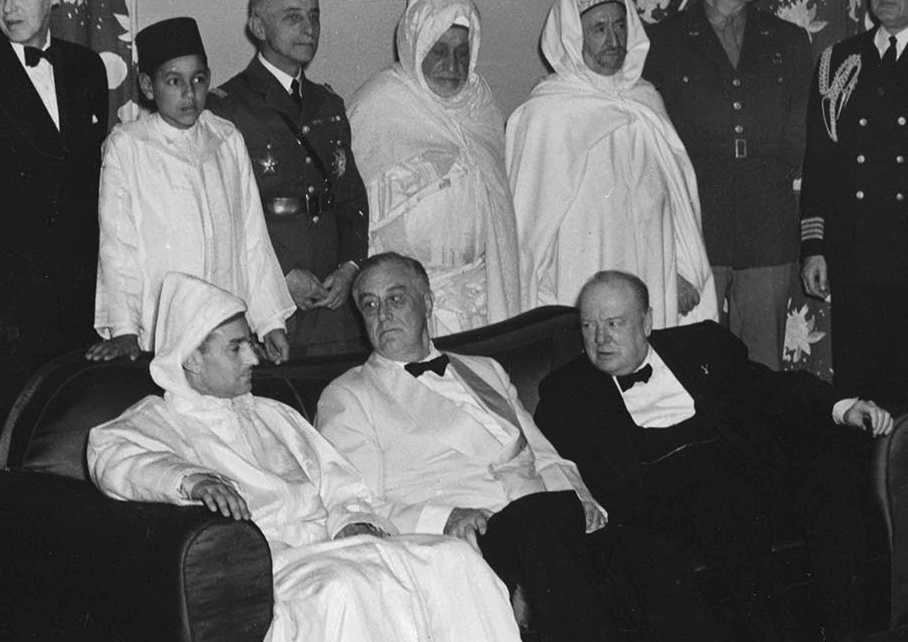
Sultan Muhammad V seated with Roosevelt and Churchill. Behind them, General Patton, Robert D. Murphy, Harry Hopkins, Hassan II, General Nogues, Muhammad al-Muqri, the Moroccan Chief of Protocol, Elliott Roosevelt, and John L. McCrea.

In July 1943, President Roosevelt, British Prime Minister Winston Churchill, and Free French commander General Charles de Gaulle met for four days in the Casablanca suburb of Anfa to discuss the occurring war. During the Casablanca Conference, the Allies agreed that the only acceptable outcome of the conflict was the "unconditional surrender" of the Axis forces. President Roosevelt also conferred privately with King Mohammed V to assure him that the United States would support Morocco's quest for independence from France. Moroccans would fight alongside Americans, notably in the form of the Moroccan Goumier units, for the remainder of WWII.

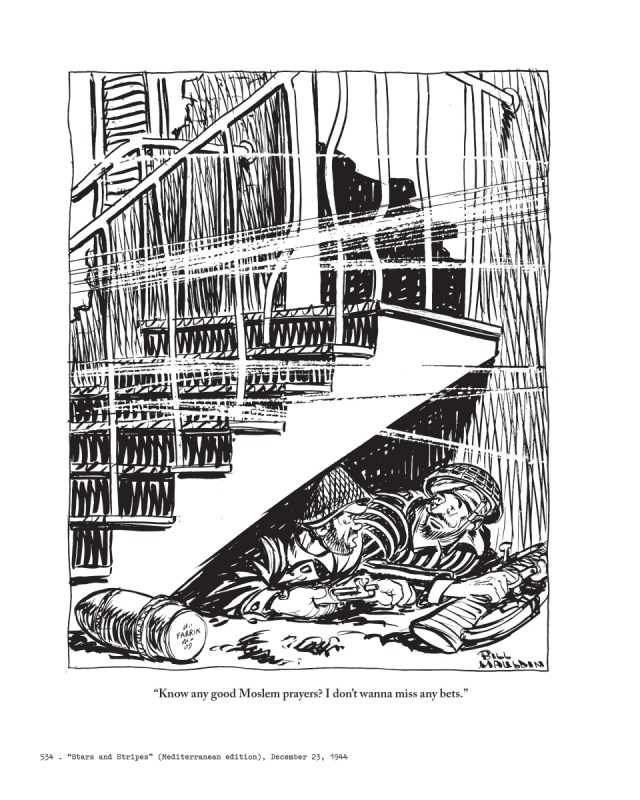
A Willie and Joe comic by Bill Mauldin (published by Stars and Stripes in December 1944), Joe and a Moroccan Goumier take cover from German gun-fire. Joe asks: "Know any good Moslem prayers? I don't wanna miss any bets."

=== 1944–1955 ===
Following the end of World War II, the US military maintained several installations in Morocco because the Mediterranean had become central to the country's European defense strategy. This was made possible by the French government, which had granted the United States several naval and air bases in its North African protectorate.

This development brought about the stationing of an increasingly large number of soldiers on Moroccan soil. Many of these servicemen were eventually approached by Moroccan nationalists who sought to internationalize their struggle for independence.

In February 1946, Abdellatif Sbihi, a Moroccan nationalist politician, co-founded the "Roosevelt Club," which aimed to regularly bring together prominent Moroccans as well as US diplomats and army officers supporting Moroccan self-determination. Their first public meeting, held on April 12, 1947, in the Tangier International Zone, was attended by over 200 Moroccan nationalists from across the entire country, as well as about 50 US diplomats. Subsequently, Tangier became a hub of the nationalists' global advocacy campaign due to the city's status as being outside of the control of the colonial powers, which enabled the Roosevelt Club to engage in a wide range of activities that brought their case to the attention of both domestic and foreign audiences.

Furthermore, Moroccan nationalists developed partnerships with former OSS (Office of Strategic Services) officers who had become acquainted with the local population during their deployment during World War II. Another group of American veterans who had established private businesses in the country after leaving the military gradually became central nodes in the nationalists' global network of supporters. French authorities remained extremely sensitive regarding contact between Americans and the Moroccan population.

Despite a great number of prominent US individuals engaging in the Moroccan nationalist cause, the US government did not officially support the independence struggle due to its European defense strategy, including maintaining political stability in North Africa and remaining close allies with France, which had just become a member state of NATO.

=== 1956–2000 ===
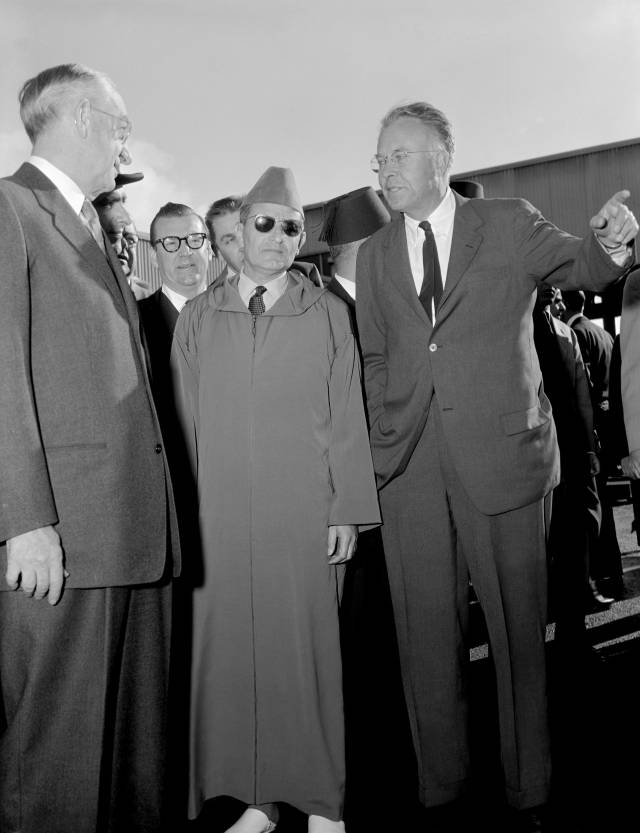
Sultan Mohammed V of Morocco visiting Lawrence Livermore National Laboratory, United States, in 1957

Since gaining independence from France on March 2, 1956, Morocco has been committed to nurturing a special relationship with the United States, based on both nations' historical ties and on a succession of personal friendships between Mohammed V, Hassan II, and now Mohammed VI and their American Presidential counterparts. Morocco has also played a critical role in explaining the larger role of Arab policy to the United States. This was particularly true under the reign of King Hassan II. The United States' continued support for Morocco was further driven by the former's interest in regional stability and the latter's phosphate reserves.

After Morocco gained independence, President Dwight D. Eisenhower sent a congratulatory message to King Mohammed V: "My Government renews its wishes for the peace and prosperity of Morocco, and has asked me to express its gratification that Morocco has freely chosen, as a sovereign nation, to continue in the path of its traditional friendships."

In November 1957, King Mohammed V traveled to Washington to pay an official call on President Eisenhower. Two years later, Eisenhower's vice president Richard Nixon traveled to Rabat to meet with the King.

In 1961, King Hassan II, Mohammed V's successor, made the first of several diplomatic visits to the United States to confer with President John F. Kennedy. King Hassan II would later journey to Washington to meet Presidents Lyndon B. Johnson, Jimmy Carter, Ronald Reagan, George H. W. Bush, and Bill Clinton.

During the Cold War, Morocco remained officially non-aligned. However, unlike most other Arab states, Morocco displayed pro-Western sympathies. Indeed, one month after conducting joint military exercises with Morocco off the coast of Western Sahara in 1986, then-Secretary of Defense, Caspar Weinberger, visited Morocco to thank King Hassan II for his efforts in the Arab–Israeli normalization process, and for seeking to mediate the United States' clash with Libyan leader Muammar Qaddafi in the bombing of Libya. In 1987, the Moroccan government agreed to the use of an old abandoned U.S. Strategic Air Command Base at Ben Guérir as a transoceanic abort landing site for NASA's space shuttles during emergencies. On the military side, Morocco signed agreements with the U.S. government allowing U.S. forces access and transit rights to Moroccan Air Force bases.

Moreover, Morocco was a major beneficiary of U.S. aid throughout the Cold War, receiving more than 400 million dollars in American aid between 1957 and 1963. In 1966, Morocco became the fifth-largest recipient of US agricultural assistance; the country had obtained more than $1 billion in military assistance and $1.3 billion in economic assistance by 1990, which amounted to more than one-fifth of the entire U.S. aid to all African countries during this period. In return, the Moroccan authorities signed a secret agreement permitting the United States to maintain powerful radio transmitters near Tangier, which served as communication and spying tools in the western Mediterranean. The CIA and the NSA acted with impunity from Hassan II's regime in return for their assistance.

President Clinton flew to Rabat in July 1999 to attend King Hassan II's funeral, and to meet the son who succeeded him, King Mohammed VI. Upon taking the throne, King Mohammed VI made it quite clear that he wanted to continue his nation's centuries-old friendship with the United States. In his first speech as King in 1999, King Mohammed VI reaffirmed his father's policy of defending the nation's territorial integrity and strengthening ties with African nations, friends in Europe, and the United States. One year later, King Mohammed VI made his first official visit to Washington.

The leading Moroccan foreign policy official in recent times has been Taieb Fassi-Fihri, who originally served under Hassan II as Minister-Delegate for Foreign Affairs, later Minister of Foreign Affairs. Serving as adviser to King Mohammed VI after 2012, he overshadows the foreign minister, Mohammed Ben Aissa. Fassi-Fihri takes the lead on certain aspects of Moroccan foreign policy, including relations with the United States.

=== 2001–present ===
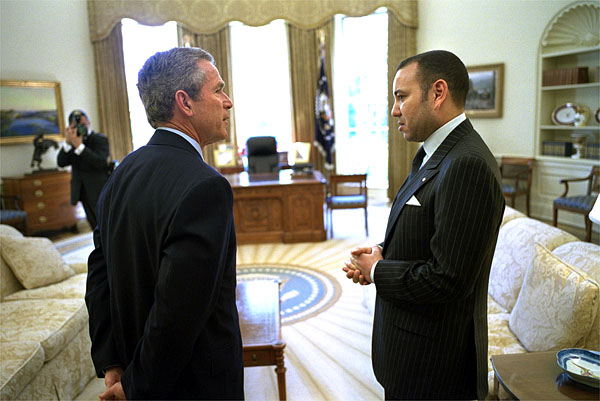
43rd President George W. Bush meeting with King Mohammed VI of Morocco in the White House in Washington, D.C. in April 2002

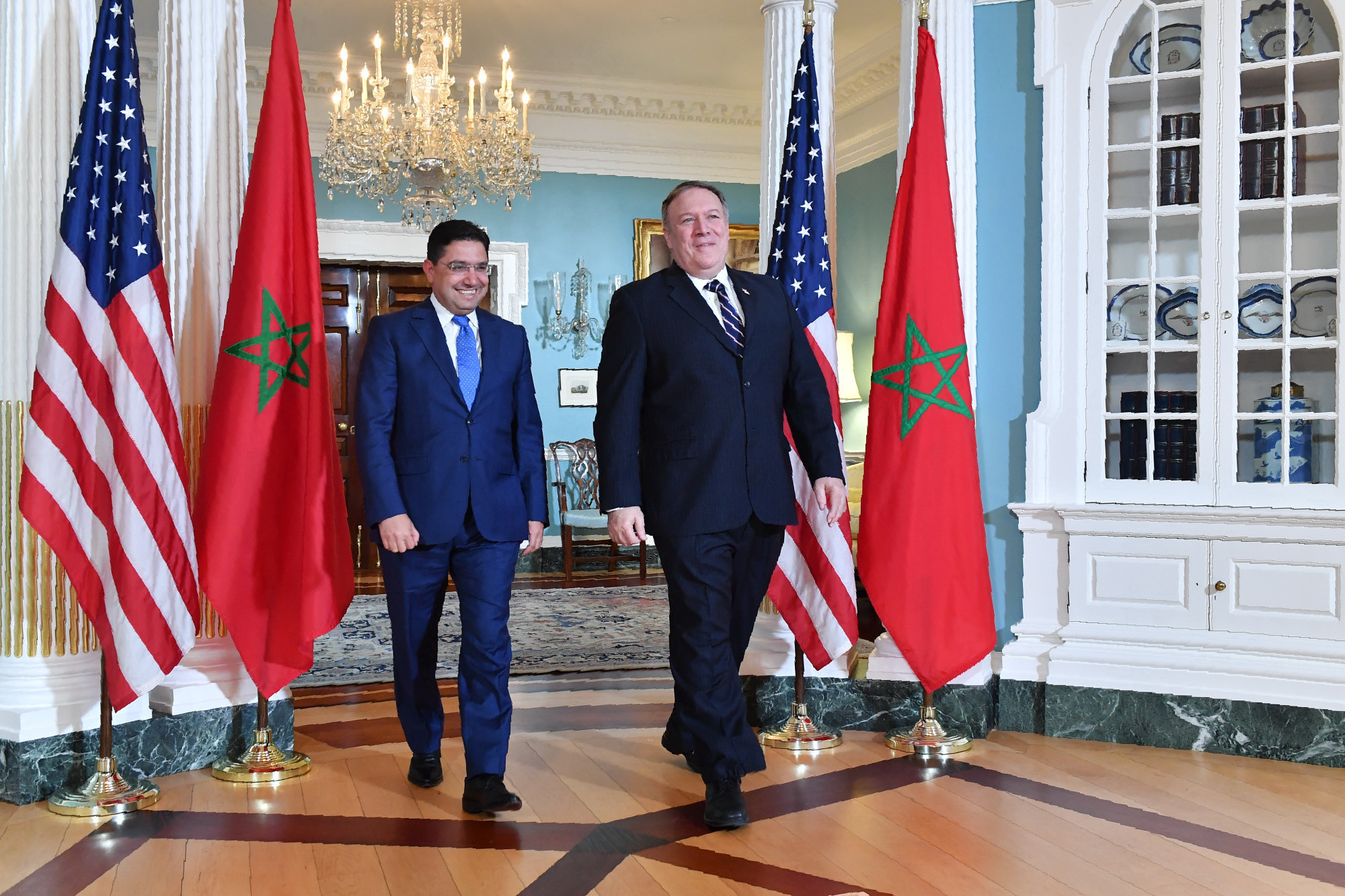
Secretary of State Mike Pompeo with Moroccan Foreign Minister Nasser Bourita in September 2018

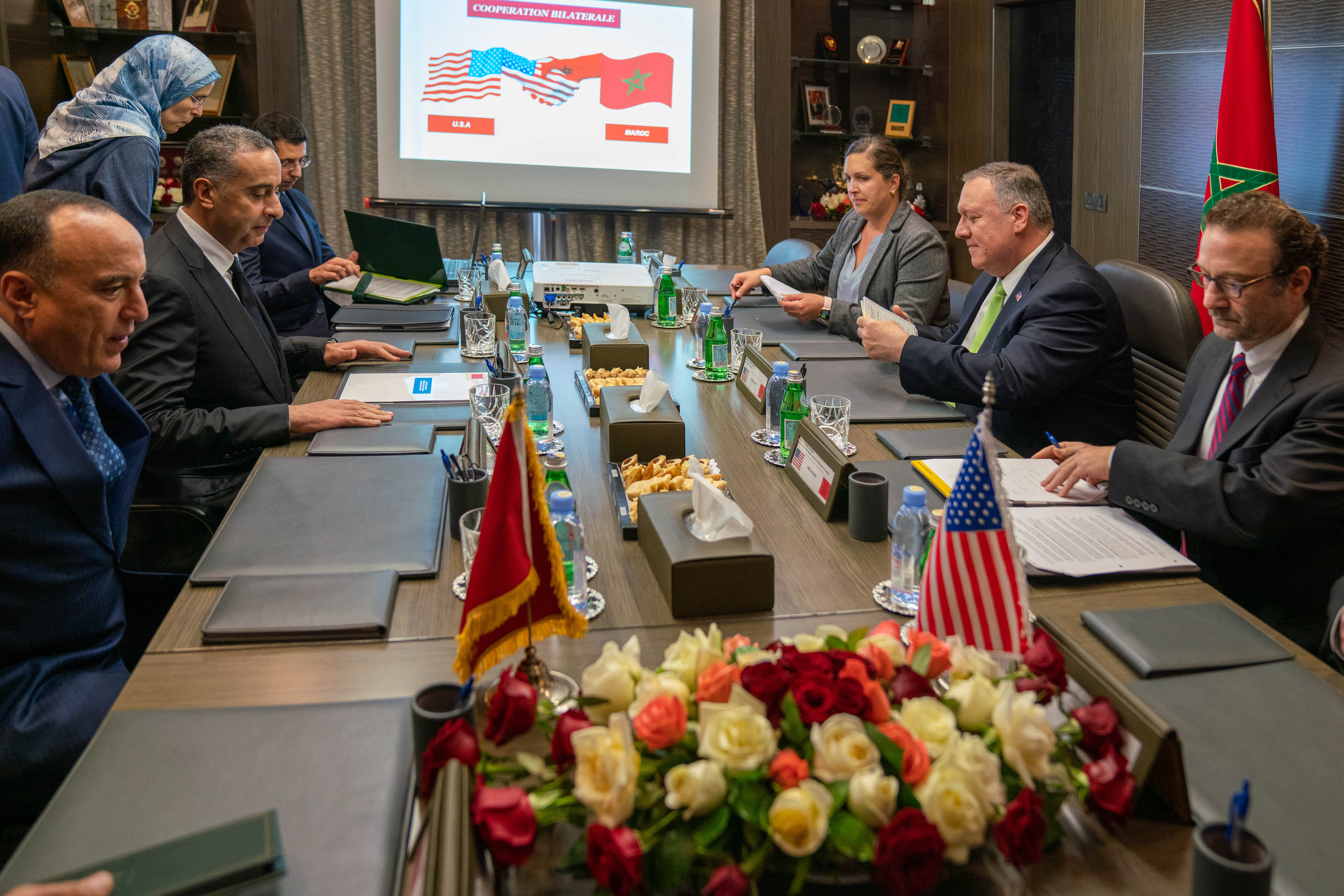
Moroccan (left) and American (right) diplomats meet in 2019

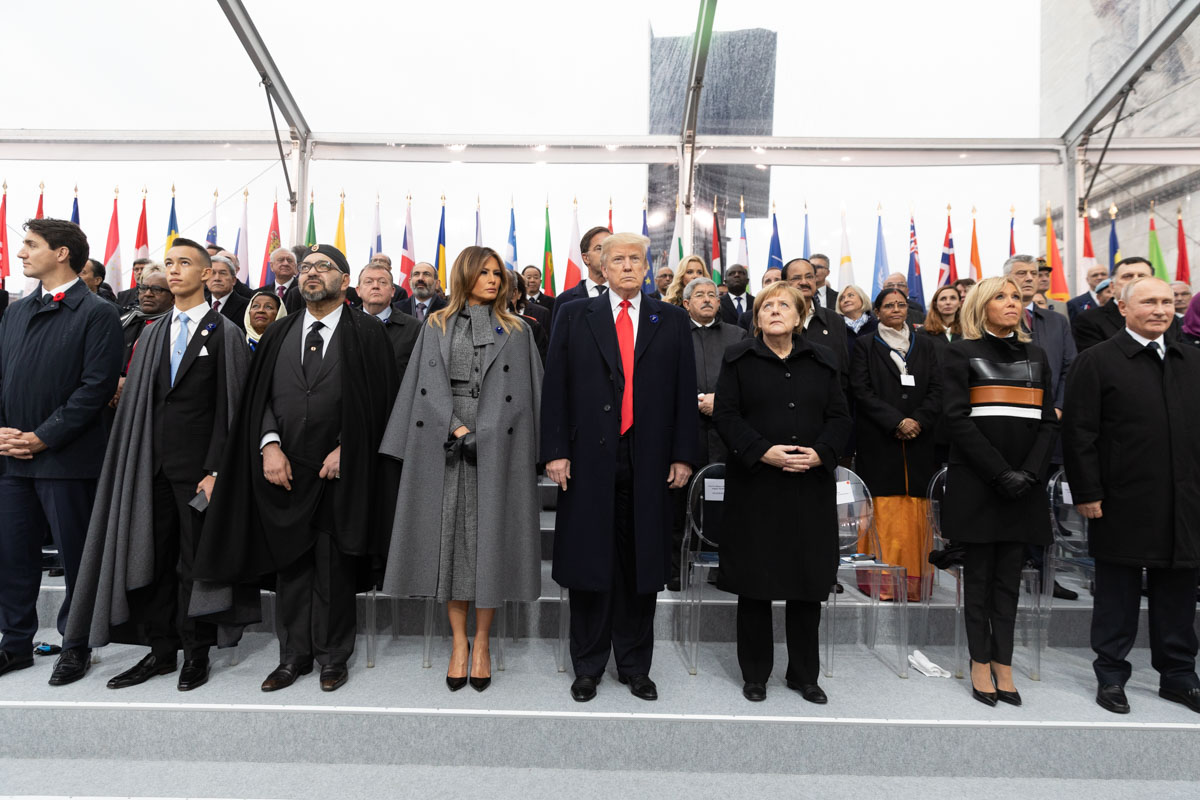
American President Donald Trump and First Lady Melania Trump accompanied by Moroccan King Mohammed VI and Crown Prince Moulay Hassan in 2018

In the 21st century, both countries have become close allies in the global war on terror.

Morocco was among the first Arab and Islamic states to denounce the September 11 terrorist attacks in the United States and declare solidarity with the American people in fighting terrorism. After the September 11 attacks, Morocco has been instrumental in supporting the United States. For example, King Mohammed VI presided over a mass service in support of the victims of the September 11 attacks. Additionally, security cooperation between the two countries is well developed. King Mohammed VI collaborates with U.S. intelligence and security officials in providing intelligence and preventing terrorist attacks in the Straits of Gibraltar. In January 2004, Morocco was designated a major non-NATO ally as a reward for its collaboration.

Morocco also plays a pivotal role in the Trans-Saharan Counterterrorism Initiative to contain Islamist Insurgency in the Maghreb and in the Sahel. Likewise, when Casablanca was the victim of terrorist bombings on May 16, 2003, the U.S. government offered Morocco the full resources of its military and intelligence community. Furthermore, the CIA has utilized Morocco as a source for recruiting Arabic-speaking spies.

The United States and Morocco signed a Free Trade Agreement (FTA) on June 15, 2004, which went into effect on January 1, 2006. The Kingdom of Morocco submitted an official statement on the matter for a U.S. House of Representatives Congressional Hearing in June 2007. It read, in part, "Morocco is pleased to see that the United States has over the last several years very substantially increased its engagement in the Maghreb. Morocco is a longtime partner of the United States and our experience with your great nation over the last two centuries has persuaded us that there is much that we can accomplish together. The FTA between Morocco and the USA is a great opportunity for US companies to increase their market shares …" The FTA also stipulates broad labor protections for both countries, with a dual focus on transparency and maintaining said protections while promoting economic growth. The explicitly defined protections laid out in the Labor section of the agreement are essentially the general rights promoted by the International Labor Organization in their 1998 declaration; however, the Labor section also provides a framework by which the countries may cooperate to extend labor rights further. The developments listed as potentially pursuable include the establishment of "social safety net programs," regulation of "working conditions," and "timely" creation of "labor market statistics." In 2008, U.S. direct investment in Morocco was about 7%, and U.S. aid to Morocco was about 4%. In 2017, US direct investment in Morocco had risen to 21.4%.

On December 22, 2009, the United States government awarded Lockheed Martin an $841.9 million contract to complete the production of 24 F-16 aircraft for Morocco. The contract added to an initial $233 million awarded to Lockheed Martin in June 2008 to begin production of the aircraft.

Morocco and the United States coordinated efforts to minimize threats and expand cooperation on nuclear incident response in January 2010. The United States' National Nuclear Security Administration (NNSA) partnered with Morocco's National Center for Nuclear Energy, Science and Technologies for four days of training and demonstrations in Rabat, Morocco. The training sessions were held to address potential radiological emergencies and nuclear incidents. Bilateral cooperation involves technical exchanges, mutual training events, jointly conducted exercises, and emergency management assistance. According to NNSA Associate Administrator for Emergency Operations, Joseph Krol, "NNSA's work with Morocco [is] part of our broader effort under the Global Initiative to Combat Nuclear Terrorism to build and enhance the global capacity to prevent and respond to nuclear and radiological emergencies." According to the NNSA, "Enhanced international cooperation with Morocco is an important step in countering [the] threat [of terrorists acquiring a nuclear weapon]." On March 16, 2010, Moroccan Princess Lalla Hasna, the sister of the Moroccan King, met with Secretary of State Hillary Clinton. They mainly discussed the Earth Day celebration in Morocco, which is part of the National Charter for the Environment and Sustainable Development that King Mohammed VI called for in his last State of the Nation Address.

In March 2010, Morocco expelled U.S. citizens (as well as citizens from the Netherlands, South Africa, and New Zealand) who were staffing an orphanage. They were accused of spreading Christianity (which can be practiced but not evangelized in Morocco) and ordered to leave immediately. This resulted in the U.S. Ambassador to Morocco Samuel L. Kaplan declaring that Morocco's actions "violate fundamental rules of due process." He further stated that the United States was in "distress" about the decision.

On July 19, 2021, the U.S. Department of State under the Biden Administration released Moroccan national Abdul Latif Nasir from the Guantanamo Bay detention camp into the custody of his home country. A State Department spokesman stated, "The United States is grateful to the government of Morocco for its willingness to support ongoing U.S. efforts to close the Guantanamo Bay Detention Facility."

On March 7, 2024, President Joe Biden welcomed Youssef Amrani at the White House, where he presented his credentials as the Ambassador of Morocco to the United States. Following the reception, Amrani expressed his commitment to work in accordance with the directives of King Mohammed VI to deepen the historical and strategic alliance between Morocco and the United States.

In the military field, as part of the 13th session of the Defense Advisory Committee, the Inspector General of the Royal Armed Forces and Commander of the Southern Zone received, on May 20, 2024, at the General Headquarters of the Royal Armed Forces in Rabat, the U.S. Assistant Secretary of Defense for International Security Affairs, Ms. Celeste Wallander. She was accompanied by the U.S. military attaché accredited in Morocco, leading a significant military delegation to discuss security and defense challenges in Africa, combating transnational threats, as well as developments in equipment procurement.

On July 2, 2026, in a letter, King Mohammed VI thanked Donald Trump for recognizing Moroccan sovereignty over Western Sahara and informed him that the 1,055 km (656 mi) Tiznit-Dakhla road would be renamed in his honor. Trump responded on July 26, expressing gratitude for the recognition and wishing to drive the expressway.

== Diplomatic missions ==
United States has an embassy in Rabat, and a consulate General in Casablanca. Morocco is represented in the U.S. by its embassy to Washington, and consulates in New York and Los Angeles.

=== U.S. Embassy ===
The U.S. embassy is located in Rabat.

- Ambassador Duke Buchan

=== Moroccan Embassy ===
The Moroccan embassy is located in Washington, D.C.

- Ambassador Youssef Amrani

== American policy on Western Sahara conflict ==
=== Precedents ===
President Donald Trump issued a proclamation supporting Moroccan sovereignty over Western Sahara on the 10th of December 2020, as a tribute to Morocco's recognition of the United States in 1777. His predecessor, President Barack Obama, never made his stance on the issue clear. President Bill Clinton set a precedent which President George W. Bush followed: both Clinton and Bush sided with Morocco and maintained the position that "Genuine autonomy under Moroccan sovereignty [is] the only feasible solution." Additionally, according to a Congressional Research Service (CRS) report issued in December 2008, the official position of the United States government is to support Morocco in the dispute over Western Sahara. The report stated, "The United States supports the U.N. effort and has urged the parties to focus on autonomy—a solution that would not destabilize its ally, Morocco." Militarily, the United States has been the primary source of Morocco's weaponry in the conflict over Western Sahara. The United States provided the most support for the Royal Moroccan Air Force, which was critical when the POLISARIO began using Soviet built weapons such as the Soviet-built SA-6 surface-to-air missiles to counter the growing effectiveness of the Royal Moroccan Air Force. Thus, the United States has a history of supporting Morocco in its conflict over Western Sahara.

=== 1975–2006 ===
In the 1970s, the United States supported Morocco's annexation of Western Sahara, and made an effort to modernize Morocco's military to help with its conflict over Western Sahara. The United States focused particularly on Morocco's Royal Moroccan Air Force. Help from the United States was especially important when the Polisario deployed Soviet-built SA-6 surface-to-air missiles to counter the growing effectiveness of the Royal Moroccan Air Force. However, the Carter Administration shackled military support and weapons sales to Morocco with pre-conditions, stating the U.S. would only trade military supplies with Morocco for the purpose of modernizing Morocco's military, but not to assist with the conflict over Western Sahara. On the other hand, the Reagan Administration dropped all conditions in supporting the Moroccans, as the need for staging bases in North Africa for the Rapid Deployment Joint Task Force made access to Morocco's airfields strategically important. Beginning with the George H. W. Bush Administration, the focus of the U.S. security assistance efforts in Morocco shifted to sustaining and maintaining U.S.-origin equipment in the Moroccan Armed Forces.

In the 1980s and early 1990s, Morocco secured about 1 billion dollars annually from Saudi Arabia to purchase arms and supplies from the United States to fight the POLISARIO and defend its claim to Western Sahara. In November 1986, the United States military conducted joint exercises with Morocco off Western Sahara's Coast. In September 1987, the United States government sold Morocco 100 M48A5 tanks, used for desert terrain. During the late 1990s and early 2000s, the United States remained relatively silent on the issue, though it provided tacit support for Morocco.

=== 2007–2008 ===
In 2007, Morocco, in the Western Sahara Autonomy Proposal initiative, proposed the Polisario autonomy as an immediate and permanent solution between the two sides. Some authors claim it is the first non-maximalist approach either side has offered, while others describe it as an old attempt (copied from a 2003 proposal) without credibility. Theoretically in Morocco's autonomy plan, the only issues which the Moroccan government would control for Western Sahara would be international relations and national and foreign security. Western Sahara would control all other issues, including governmental administration, taxation, education, budgets, policing, and electing officials (though past movements of Moroccans to the Western Sahara would not be reversed).

While the current and previous two U.S. presidential administrations have not gotten deeply involved in the dispute over Western Sahara, the idea of resolving the conflict in favor of Morocco has a sizeable following in U.S. policy circles, including strong support from the U.S. House of Representatives. In June 2007, former Secretary of State Madeleine Albright, 173 members of Congress from both major American political parties, and 15 influential figures involved in national security and foreign policy signed a letter to President George W. Bush encouraging the President to get involved and assist in bringing an end to the struggle. The letter cites international stability, the war against terrorism, economic integration, and a long-standing allegiance with Morocco as some of the reasons for supporting Morocco and drawing the conflict over Western Sahara to a close. The letter stated, "Morocco's commitment merits the support of the international community…"

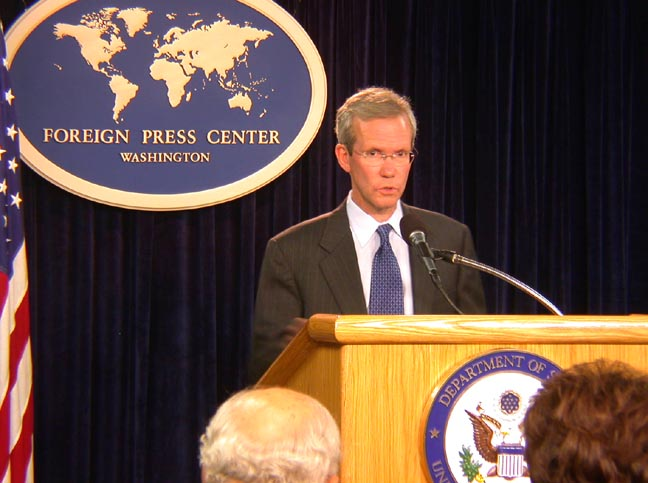
In 2007, then-Assistant Secretary of State, David Welch (2005–2008) expressed strong support for Morocco and its autonomy plan in the conflict over Western Sahara, calling the plan a "serious and credible" solution.

Likewise, in an official statement for a Congressional hearing held in June 2007, the Kingdom of Morocco asserted, "We recognize that fundamental compromises must be made in order to solve this problem and free our region to move forward together. Morocco's recent initiative in the United Nations Security Council, supported in the letter signed by 173 members of Congress, is intended to demonstrate our willingness to make such compromises in the interest of all the people of the Maghreb and particularly of the Sahara. In that same spirit, we appreciate the attention of your Committee in helping us move this issue forward to a successful resolution."

Speaking at the same 2007 hearing, former U.S. Assistant Secretary of State, David Welch articulated that the Department of State sided with Morocco on the issue of Western Sahara. He explained that the conflict is a "…destabilizing element [which] thwarts regional ties, which are necessary for economic expansion, and it has had an effect on government-to-government cooperation within the Maghreb." He then affirmed the State Department's role, stating, "We have welcomed, Mr. Chairman, Morocco's recent initiative to resolve the dispute…. We consider the Moroccan proposal to provide real autonomy for the Western Sahara to be serious and credible." Conversely, in regards to the Polisario Front proposal, Welch stated, "The POLISARIO proposal…does not seem, in our judgment, to contain new ideas…"

In response to the 2007 letter to President Bush, the 2008 Congressional Research Service report stated, "U.S. officials would prefer a solution to the Western Sahara dispute that would not destabilize Mohammed VI's rule. They also believe that a settlement would enhance regional stability and economic prosperity."

Despite all of this, the United States at the time neither formally recognized Morocco's legitimate authority over Western Sahara nor Western Sahara's sovereignty. However, the 2008 CRS Report noted that in 2007 the U.S. Undersecretary of State, Nicholas Burns backed Morocco's 2007 autonomy plan as "serious and credible."

As of 2008, the Moroccan forces in Western Sahara numbered around 100,000 (the majority of the Moroccan Army), while the POLISARIO was only supported by about 3,000 to 6,000 soldiers.

=== 2009–present ===
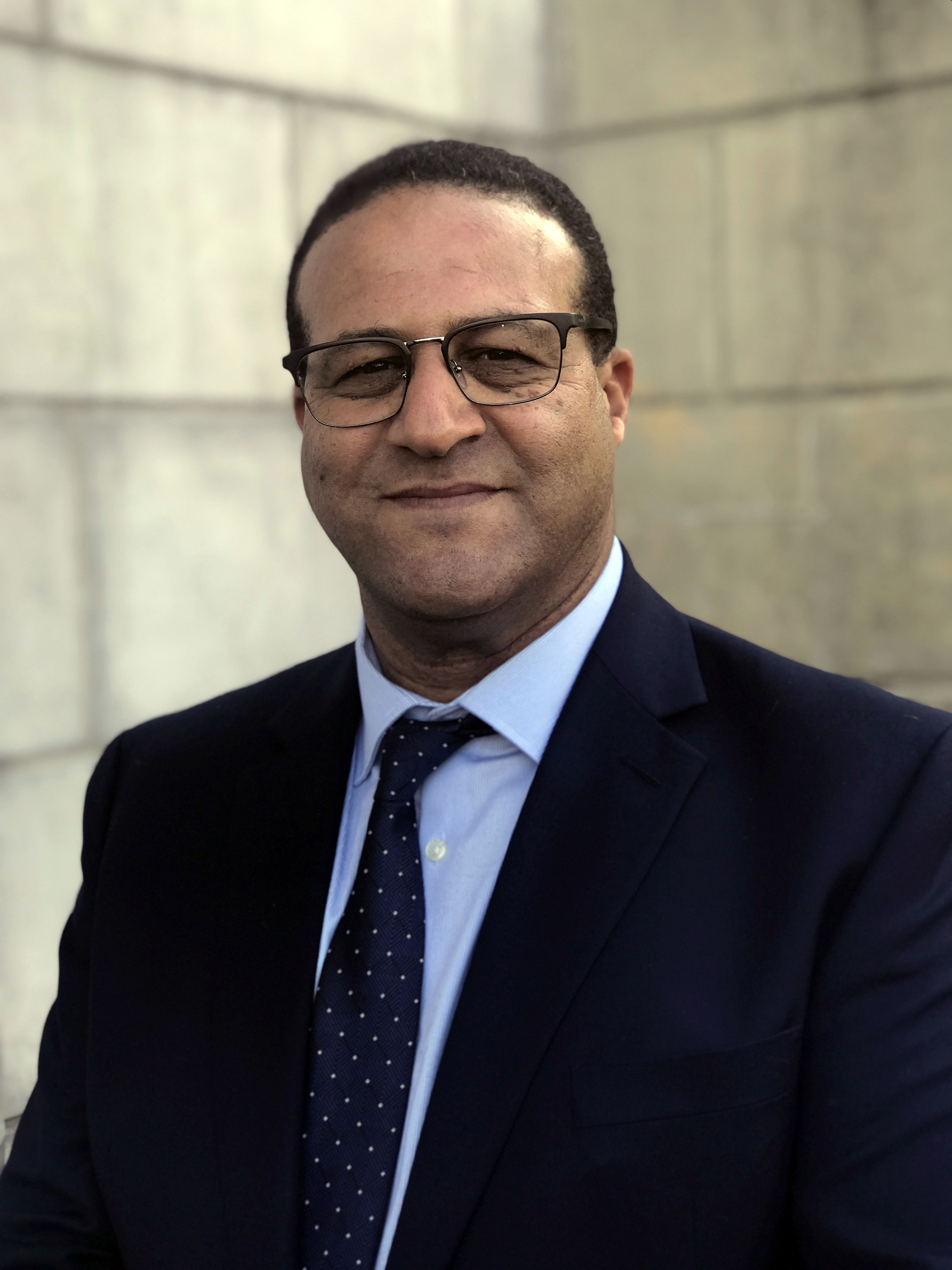
Consul General of Morocco in New York Abdelkader Jamoussi at the Moroccan Cultural Day Festival in Union City, New Jersey

In April 2009, 229 members of the U.S. House of Representatives, a clear majority and over 50 more than signed the letter in 2007, called on President Barack Obama to support Morocco's peace plan and to assist in drawing the conflict to a close. The signers included Democratic Majority Leader Steny Hoyer and Republican Minority Leader John Boehner. In addition to noting that Western Sahara has become a recruiting post for "Islamic terrorism", the letter affirmed that the conflict is "the single greatest obstacle impending the security and cooperation necessary to combat terrorism in the Maghreb." The letter referenced UN Security Council Resolution 1813 (2008) and encouraged President Obama to follow the policy set by President Clinton and followed by President Bush, stating, "Genuine autonomy under Moroccan sovereignty [is] the only feasible solution." The Congressmen expressed concerns about Western Sahara's viability. They referenced a UN fact-finding mission to Western Sahara, which confirmed the State Department's view that the Polisario proposal, which ultimately stands for independence, would lead to a non-viable state. In closing, the letter stated, "We remain convinced that the U.S. position, favoring autonomy for Western Sahara under Moroccan sovereignty is the only feasible solution. We urge you to both sustain this longstanding policy, and to make clear, in both words and actions, that the United States will work to ensure that the UN process continues to support this framework as the only realistic compromise that can bring this unfortunate and longstanding conflict to an end."

Members of the U.S. Senate, realizing similar "worrisome trends" in the region, also drafted a letter of support for Morocco. In March 2010, a bipartisan majority of U.S. Senators signed a letter to Secretary of State Hillary Clinton calling for the United States to support Morocco's autonomy plan. Similar to the House of Representatives letter to President Obama, the 54 bipartisan Senators (30 Democrats and 24 Republicans) who signed the letter stated concerns about growing instability in the region, including a terrorist threat. The letter openly called on Secretary Clinton and the Obama Administration to provide: "…more sustained American attention to one of the region's most pressing political issues, the Western Sahara." The letter further stated: "As you acknowledged in your remarks in Morocco last November, it has been the policy of the United States to support a resolution of this conflict based on this formula since the Administration of President Clinton. We support this bipartisan U.S. policy and the efforts of the United Nations to bring all parties together to resolve this matter peacefully at the negotiating table." Signers included Senate Intelligence Committee Chairwoman, Senator Dianne Feinstein (D-CA) and ranking Intelligence Committee member Senator Kit Bond (R-MO). Regarding Morocco's autonomy plan, Senator Feinstein said, "The way I feel about it, Morocco has been a staunch ally of the United States, this is a big problem, and this is a reasonable way to settle it."

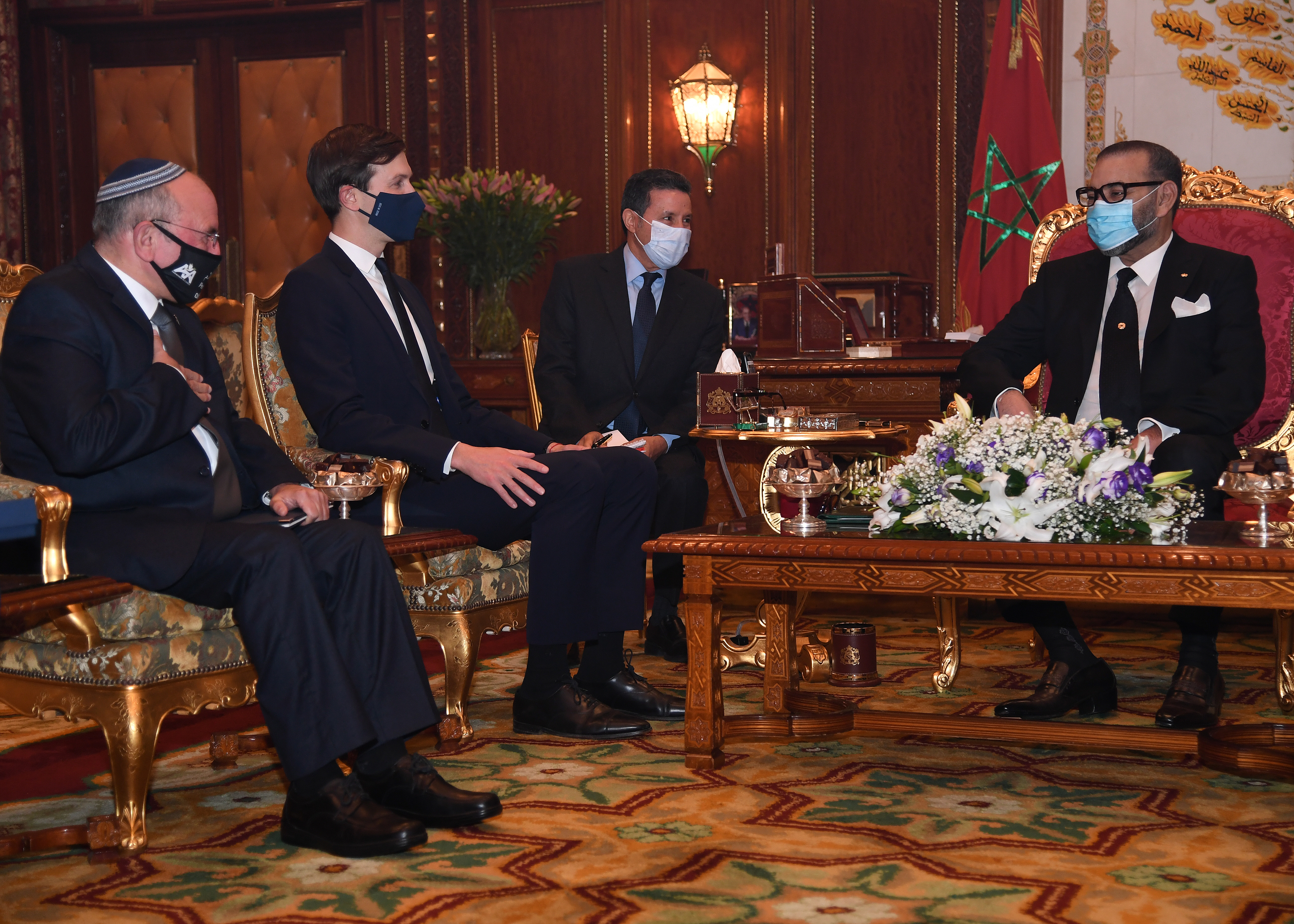
Jared Kushner, Senior Advisor to the U.S. President, and Meir Ben-Shabbat, Israel's National Security Advisor, led a joint U.S.-Israeli delegation to Rabat on December 22, 2020

On December 10, 2020, President Donald Trump announced that the United States would officially recognize Morocco's claims over Western Sahara, as a result of Morocco's agreement to normalize relations with Israel. Morocco annexed much of the territory in 1975. The following day, the Trump administration moved forward with $1 billion in sales of drones and other precision-guided weapons. On January 15, 2021, during a visit to the White House, King Mohammed VI awarded President Trump the Order of Muhammad, and Trump in return awarded the King with the Legion of Merit, degree of Chief Commander. A US consulate in Dakhla was announced, with a ceremony held to start the process of initiating it the same month.

On April 8, 2025, The US State Department, released a statement, reiterating the United States’ recognition of Morocco’s sovereignty over the Sahara and its strong support for the autonomy proposal presented by Morocco, describing it as the “only serious, credible, and realistic solution” for achieving a just and lasting resolution to the conflict. In addition, it called on all parties to engage without delay in negotiations using Morocco’s proposal as the sole framework for a mutually agreed-upon solution, expressing America’s readiness to facilitate progress.

In a letter to Mohammed VI on August 1, 2026, marking the 27th anniversary of his coronation, Donald Trump reaffirmed his unwavering support for Rabat's Western Sahara plan.

== See also ==
- Moroccan Americans
- African Lion Maneuvers
