= Mordecai Myers =

Mordecai Myers may refer to:

- Mordecai Myers (Georgia politician) (1794–1865)
- Mordecai Myers (New York politician) (1776–1871)
