= American Legation, Tangier =

Historic building in Morocco

- American Legation
- U.S. National Register of Historic Places
- U.S. National Historic Landmark
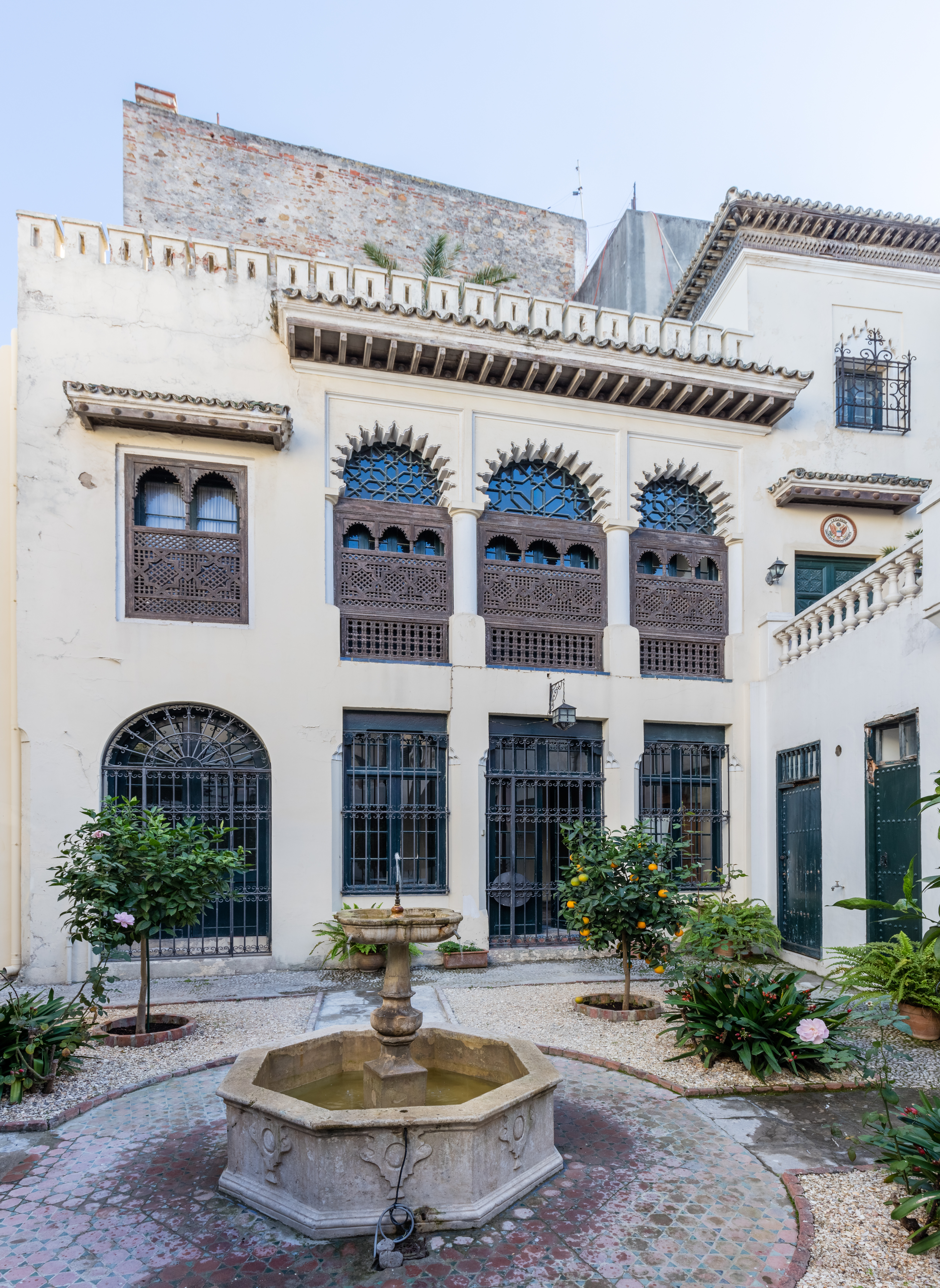
- Courtyard of the Legation

- Location within Morocco
- Location: Tangier, Morocco
- Coordinates: 35°47′02″N 5°48′38″W
- Built: 1821
- Architectural style: Moorish architecture
- NRHP reference No.: 81000703

Significant dates
- Added to NRHP: January 8, 1981
- Designated NHL: December 17, 1982

The Tangier American Legation (Arabic: المفوضية الأميركية في طنجة; French: Légation américaine de Tanger), officially the Tangier American Legation Institute for Moroccan Studies (TALIMS), is a building in the medina of Tangier, Morocco, that formerly housed the United States diplomatic mission to Morocco. It was the first American public property abroad and is the only U.S. National Historic Landmark in a foreign country. (Note: Excluding those in the Compact of Free Association.)

The legation was established on May 17, 1821, following decades of cordial relations between the U.S. and Morocco; Sultan Mohammed ben Abdallah had issued a proclamation recognizing U.S. independence from Great Britain on December 20, 1777, making his nation the first to do so. The building was gifted by the sultan to the U.S. government to serve as a diplomatic post, for which it remained for the next 140 years.

After Morocco's diplomatic capital moved to Rabat in 1956, the building served a variety of government functions, before gradually falling into neglect and disrepair. In 1976, former U.S. diplomats established the nonprofit Tangier American Legation Museum Society to restore and preserve the structure; the site has since served as a cultural center, museum, and research library, concentrating on Arabic language studies.

The Tangier American Legation is considered a symbol of the historic cultural and diplomatic relations between the U.S. and the Kingdom of Morocco, and of long-running American engagement with the wider Islamic world. In recognition of its historic and cultural importance, the site was listed on the U.S. National Register of Historic Places in 1981 and designated a National Historic Landmark the following year; it is one of 39 properties owned by the U.S. Department of State listed in the Register of Culturally Significant Property.

== Diplomatic history ==
The legation is an elaborate Moorish-style building of stuccoed masonry. This complex structure contains the two-story mud and stone building presented to the United States in 1821 by Sultan Moulay Suliman. The first property acquired abroad by the United States government, it housed the United States Legation and Consulate for 140 years, the longest period any building abroad has been occupied as a United States diplomatic post. It is symbolic of the 1786 Moroccan–American Treaty of Friendship, which is still in force today. During the 1862 Tangier Difficulty, two Confederate prisoners were held at the consulate until they could be transferrred to a US Navy ship. The complex expanded over the years as the surrounding houses were bought up. During World War II it served as headquarters for United States intelligence agents.

After the move to Rabat as the diplomatic capital in 1956, when the country gained its independence, the Legation was abandoned as a diplomatic building. Over the years the United States government proceeded to use it as consul offices and Peace Corps offices, among other things. In time it became neglected and threatened with demolition.

== Present ==
In 1976 a group of American citizens established a public, non-profit organization to save the Old American Legation (as it is known locally). Today the Tangier American Legation Museum Society rents the structure, which is still owned by the United States government.

The Tangier American Legation Institute for Moroccan Studies (TALIM) is a museum and cultural center for the study of Morocco and Morocco–United States relations, and it has many paintings by Marguerite McBey, Mohamed Hamri and other artists. In 2010, TALIM expanded the original Paul Bowles room to The Paul Bowles Wing, three rooms devoted to the expatriate writer and composer Paul Bowles. In 1999, the Legation received its initial donation of furniture, photographs and documents for the original Paul Bowles Room compiled by Gloria Kirby, a permanent resident of Tangier and friend of Bowles. The museum also has a research library and conference room. TALIM's community outreach programs include Arabic literacy courses for women living in the Tangier medina. Jen Rasamimanana is the current museum director.

== Gallery ==
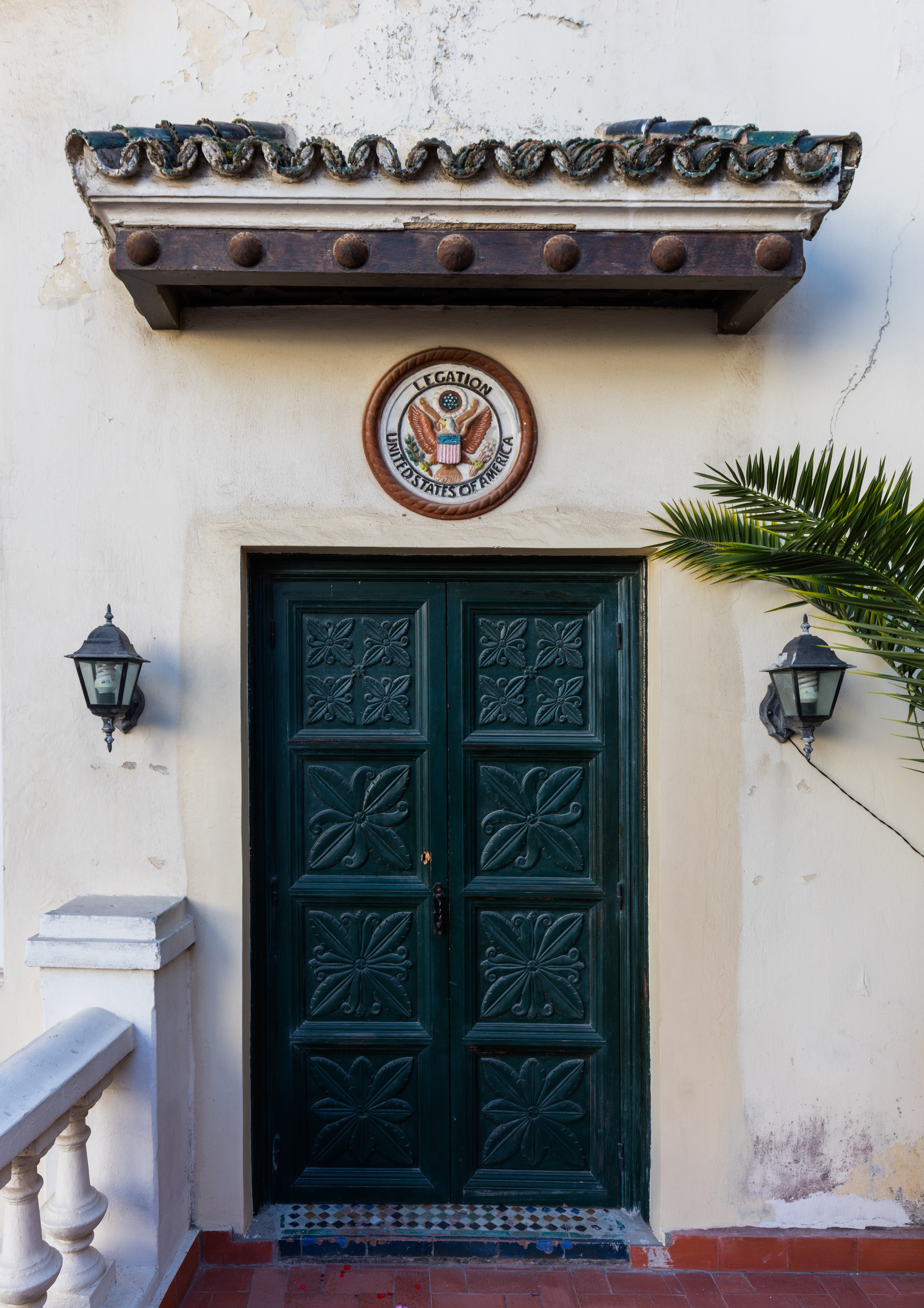
Entrance to the building

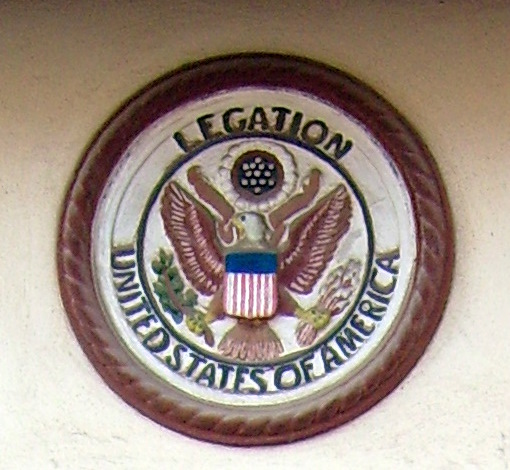
American Legation Seal above the door

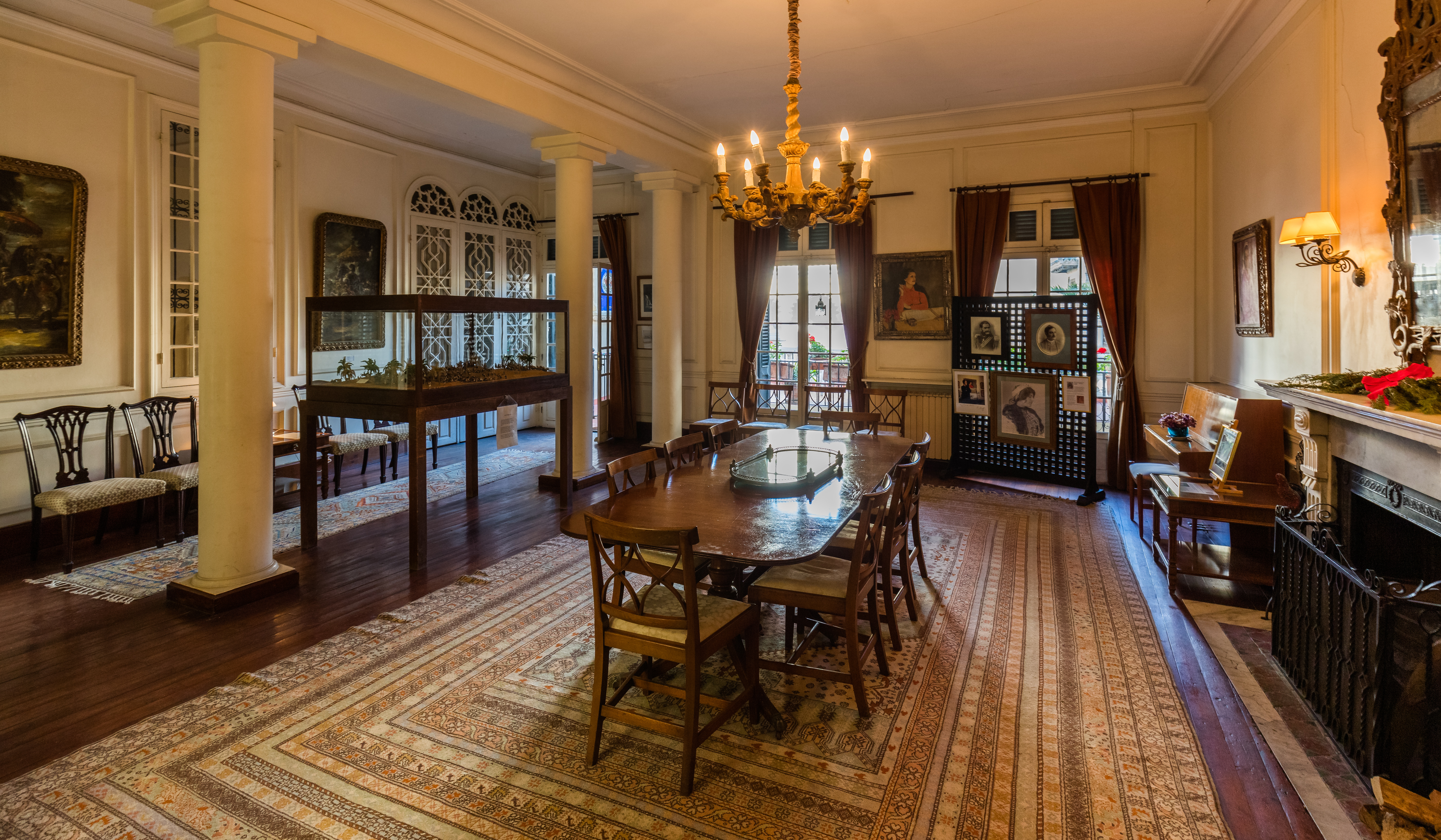
Dining room

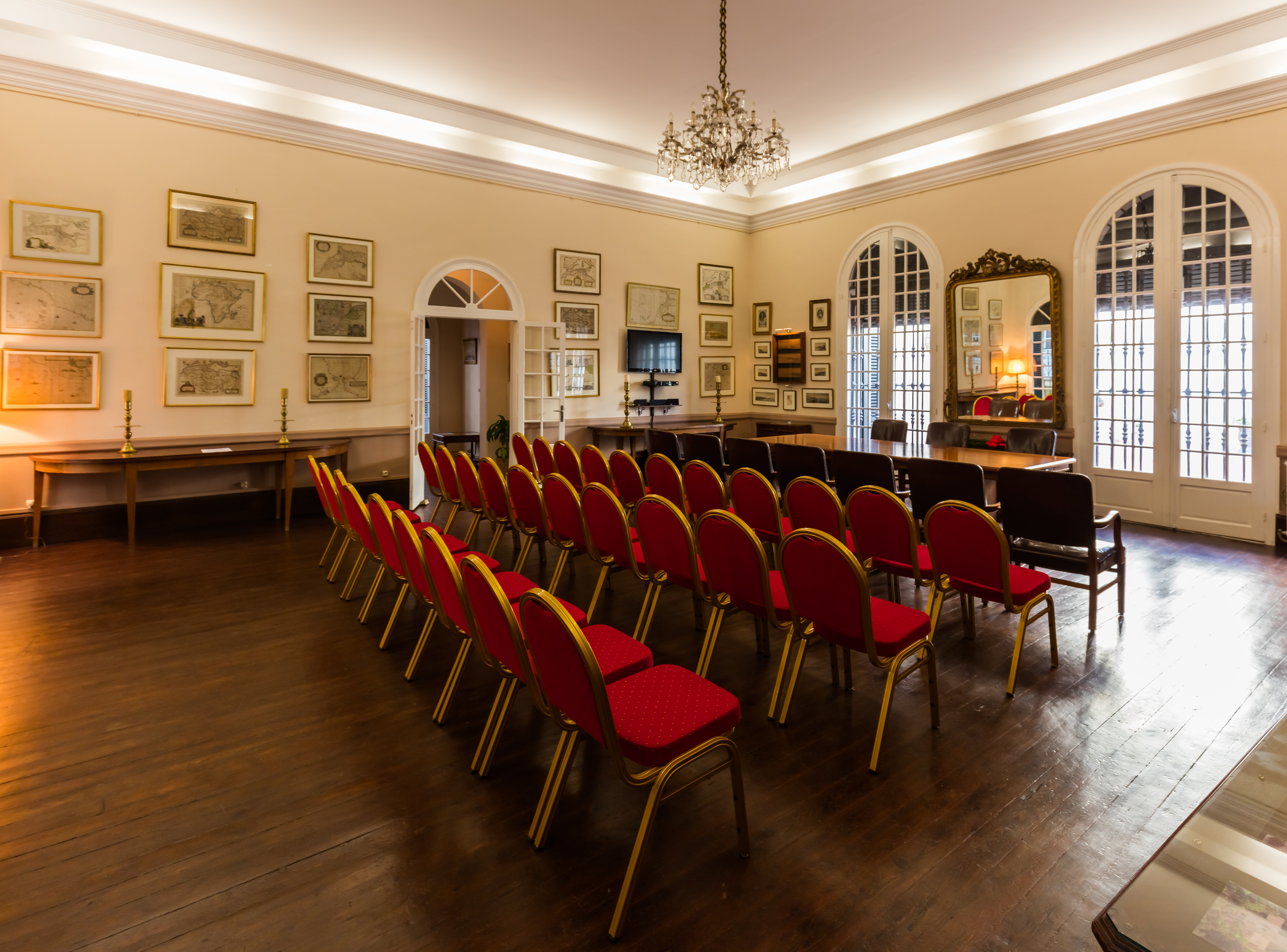
Conference room

== See also ==
- French Consulate General, Tangier
- Moroccan seizure of the Betsey
- Perdicaris affair
- Tangier International Zone
