= Henry Myers (United States Navy) =

Lieutenant-commander in the U.S. Navy

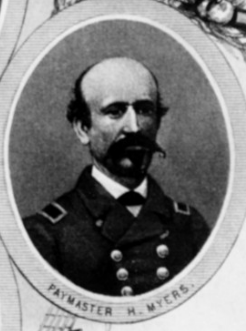
- Myers, pictured in the second half of the 19th century
- Born: c. 1827; Savannah, Georgia, U.S.
- Died: March 20, 1901 (aged 73 or 74); Jacksonville, Florida, U.S.
- Resting place: St. James Episcopal Cemetery, Marietta, Georgia, U.S.
- Occupation: Lieutenant-commander in the United States Navy
- Spouse: Jane Eliza Green
- Parent(s): Mordecai Myers; Sarah Henrietta Cohen

Henry Myers (c. 1827 – March 20, 1901) was a lieutenant-commander in the United States Navy and Confederate States Navy.

== Life and career ==
Myers was born in 1827 to Mordecai Myers and Sarah Henrietta Cohen. His father was the only survivor from his family of fifteen after their home was swept into the ocean in Georgetown, South Carolina, during a hurricane on September 27, 1822. His father buried the victims, which included his parents.

He was appointed paymaster in the United States Navy early in his life. When Georgia seceded in the Civil War, he joined the Confederate States Navy. He was ordered to the CSS Sumter, commanded by Raphael Semmes. When he died, he was one of the last surviving members of the vessel.

Myers was captured in Tangier in 1862, sparking a diplomatic crisis known as the Tangier Difficulty. The Sumter was not seaworthy at the time, and was in dock at Gibraltar. Myers had travelled to Tangier while en route to purchase coal for the Sumter, under orders from Semmes. He was seized by the acting U.S. Consul in Tangier and held prisoner at the US consulate until he was put on board the USS Ino. He was then transferred to the merchantman Harvest Home; and held in leg irons until he arrived in Boston harbor and was imprisoned at Fort Warren. "The entire proceedings were deemed at the time as partaking in the character of an outrage," wrote The New York Times in Myers' obituary. His experience was discussed in the British House of Commons.

Myers was released after six months' imprisonment. At the end of the war, in 1865, Myers went to Jacksonville, Florida, where he was employed in the city's waterworks.

Myers married Jane Eliza Green, daughter of Benjamin Green and Martha Elizabeth Marvin, in 1867.

He was an occasional contributor to The New York Times.

== Death ==
Myers died in 1901, aged 73 or 74. He was buried in St. James Episcopal Cemetery in Marietta, Georgia. His wife joined him there upon her death 22 years later.
