= Legation =

Antiquated type of diplomatic mission with lower rank than an embassy

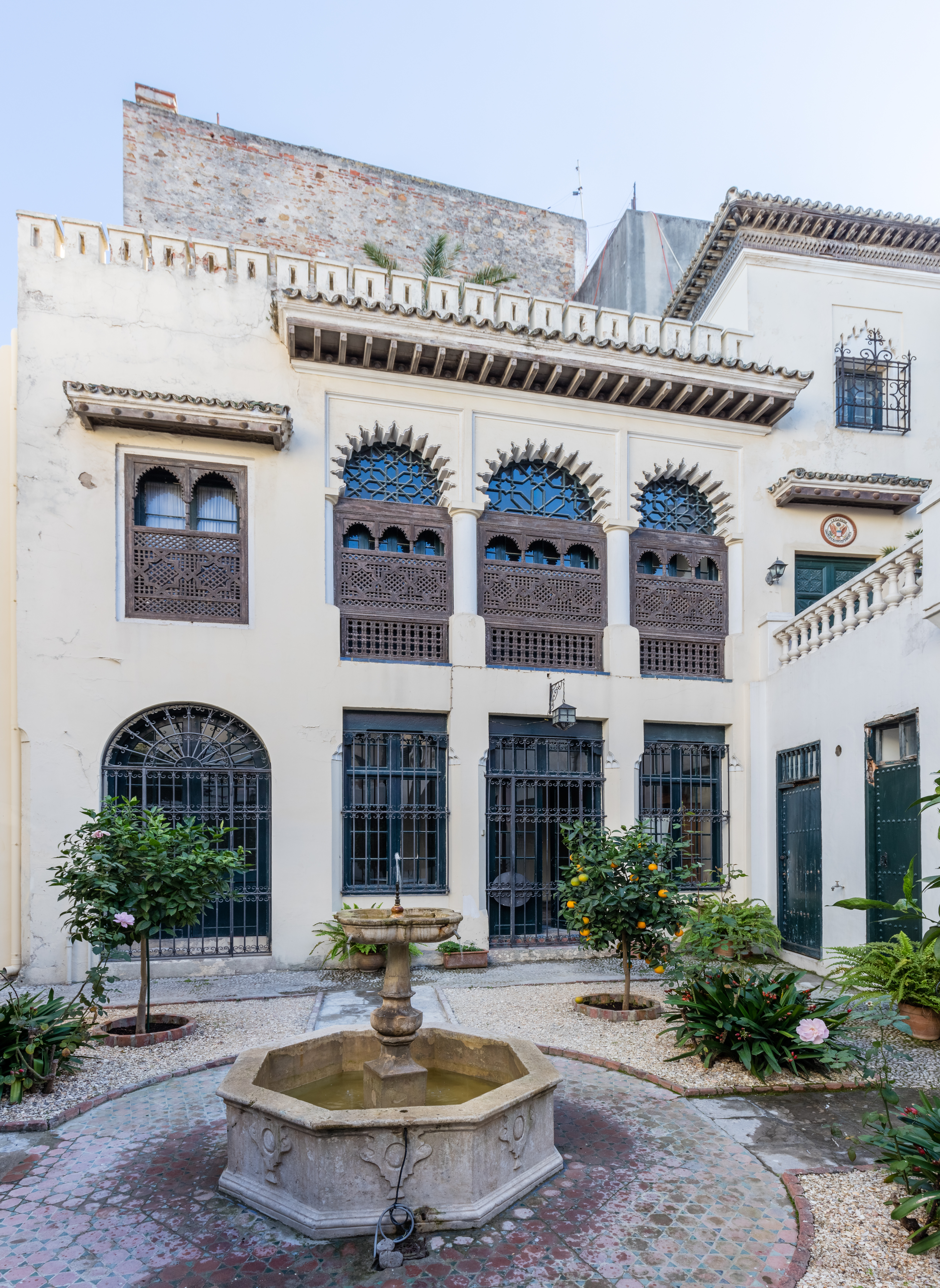
Courtyard of the U.S. Legation in Tangier, Morocco

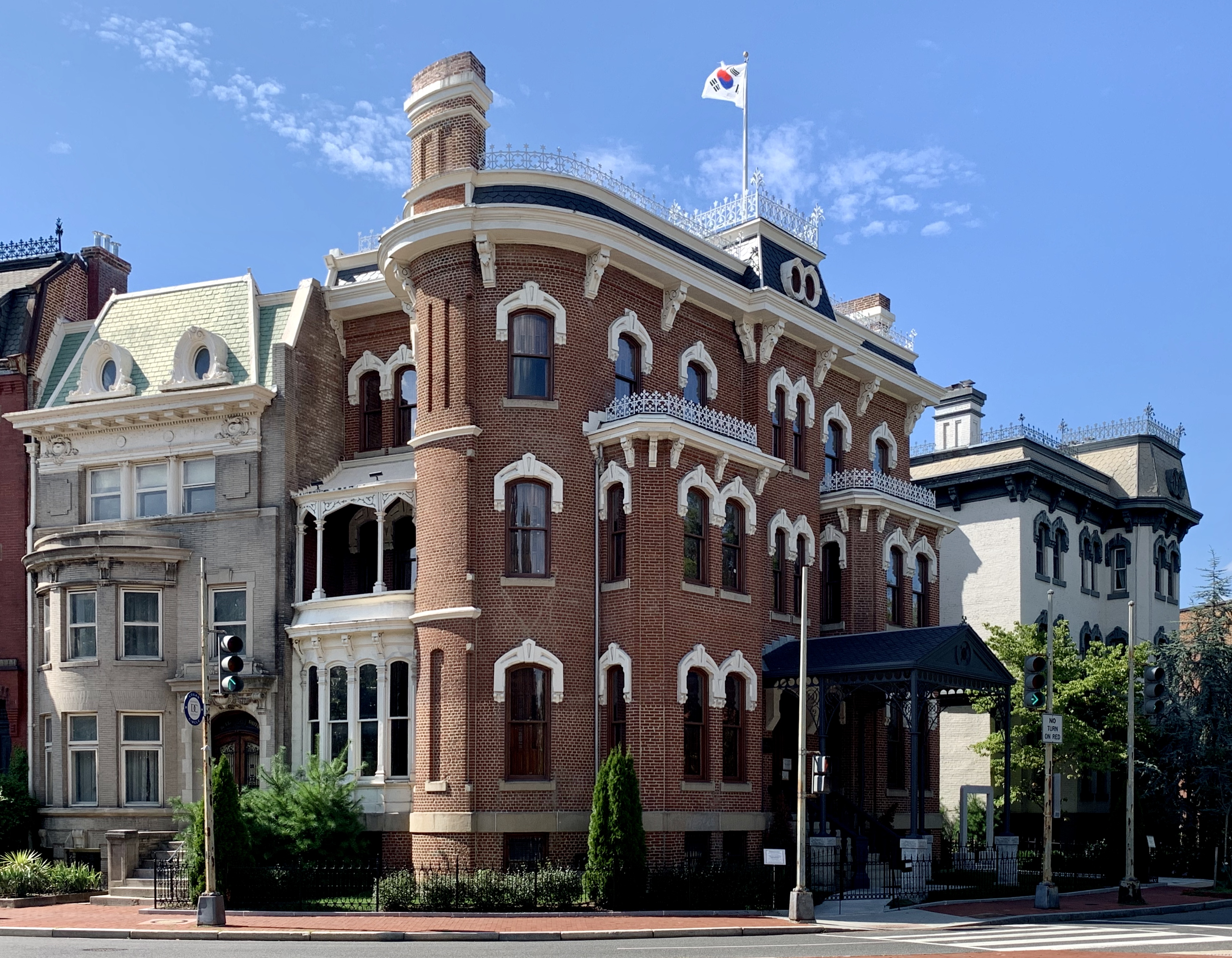
The Old Korean Legation Museum in Washington, D.C.

A legation was a diplomatic representative office of lower rank than an embassy. Whereas an embassy was headed by an ambassador, a legation was headed by a minister. Ambassadors outranked ministers and had precedence at official events. Legations were originally the most common form of diplomatic mission, but they fell out of favor after World War II and were upgraded to embassies.

== History ==
Through the 19th century and the early years of the 20th century, most diplomatic missions were legations. An ambassador was considered the personal representative of their monarch, so only a major power that was a monarchy would send an ambassador, and only to another major power that was also a monarchy. A republic or a smaller monarchy would send a minister and establish a legation. Because of diplomatic reciprocity, even a major monarchy would only establish a legation in a republic or a smaller monarchy. For example, in the waning years of the Second French Empire, the North German Confederation had an embassy in Paris, while Bavaria and the United States had legations.

The practice of establishing legations gradually fell from favor as the embassy became the standard form of diplomatic mission. The establishment of the French Third Republic and the continued growth of the United States meant that two of the great powers were now republics. The French Republic continued the French Empire's practice of sending and receiving ambassadors. In 1893, the United States followed the French precedent and began sending ambassadors, upgrading its legations to embassies. The last remaining American legations, in Bulgaria and Hungary, were upgraded to embassies in 1966.

The last legations in the world were the Baltic legations, which were upgraded to embassies in 1991 after the Baltic states restored their independence from the Soviet Union, and the legations of Finland and Sweden to South Africa, which were upgraded to embassies in 1991 and 1 November 1993 respectively after the release of Nelson Mandela from prison and as apartheid and the corresponding Nordic diplomatic embargo were coming to an end.

== See also ==
- American Legation, Tangier
- Beijing Legation Quarter
- Concession (territory)
- Papal Legations, certain administrative regions of the former Papal States, specifically the "legations" of Ferrara, Bologna, Forlì, and Ravenna
- Villa Lituania
