= Levi Myers =

Jewish physician (1767–1822)

Levi Myers (1767-1822) was a physician known for being the first Jewish medical graduate from the University of Glasgow. He was the father of Mordecai Myers.

== Early life and education ==
Myers was born on 26 October 1767 in Jacksonboro, South Carolina. His father was Mordecai Myers (1727-1788), a merchant from Rhode Island, and his mother was Esther Cohen, the daughter of a rabbi.

At the age of fifteen, Myers began apprenticing to physicians in Charleston, including David Ramsay. His medical education continued at the University of Edinburgh, where he matriculated in 1785. He was examined at the University of Glasgow, first privately by William Hamilton and Alexander Stevenson, then publicly before the Senate on 21 September 1787. He was subsequently awarded the degree of MD, and spent a further year completing his studies in Edinburgh.

== Career ==
In 1789, Myers returned to South Carolina, where he settled in Georgetown. He operated medical practices both there and in Charleston. He also ran an apothecary, which is thought to have been his primary source of income.

In 1796, Myers was elected to the State Legislature. He was appointed Apothecary General of the State in 1799, a post he held for the rest of his life. He became the first Jewish doctor to be member to the Medical Society of South Carolina. He was also a member of the Library Society of Georgetown.

Debilitated by illness, Myers generally retired from practicing medicine after 1815.

== Death ==
In September 1822, Myers was killed when a hurricane ravaged his home in North Inlet, South Carolina. His body was discovered a month later. His wife Frances Myers (née Mini), four of their children and eight slaves were also killed.

== See also ==
- History of the Jews in Scotland
