= Tangier Difficulty =

American Civil War diplomatic crisis

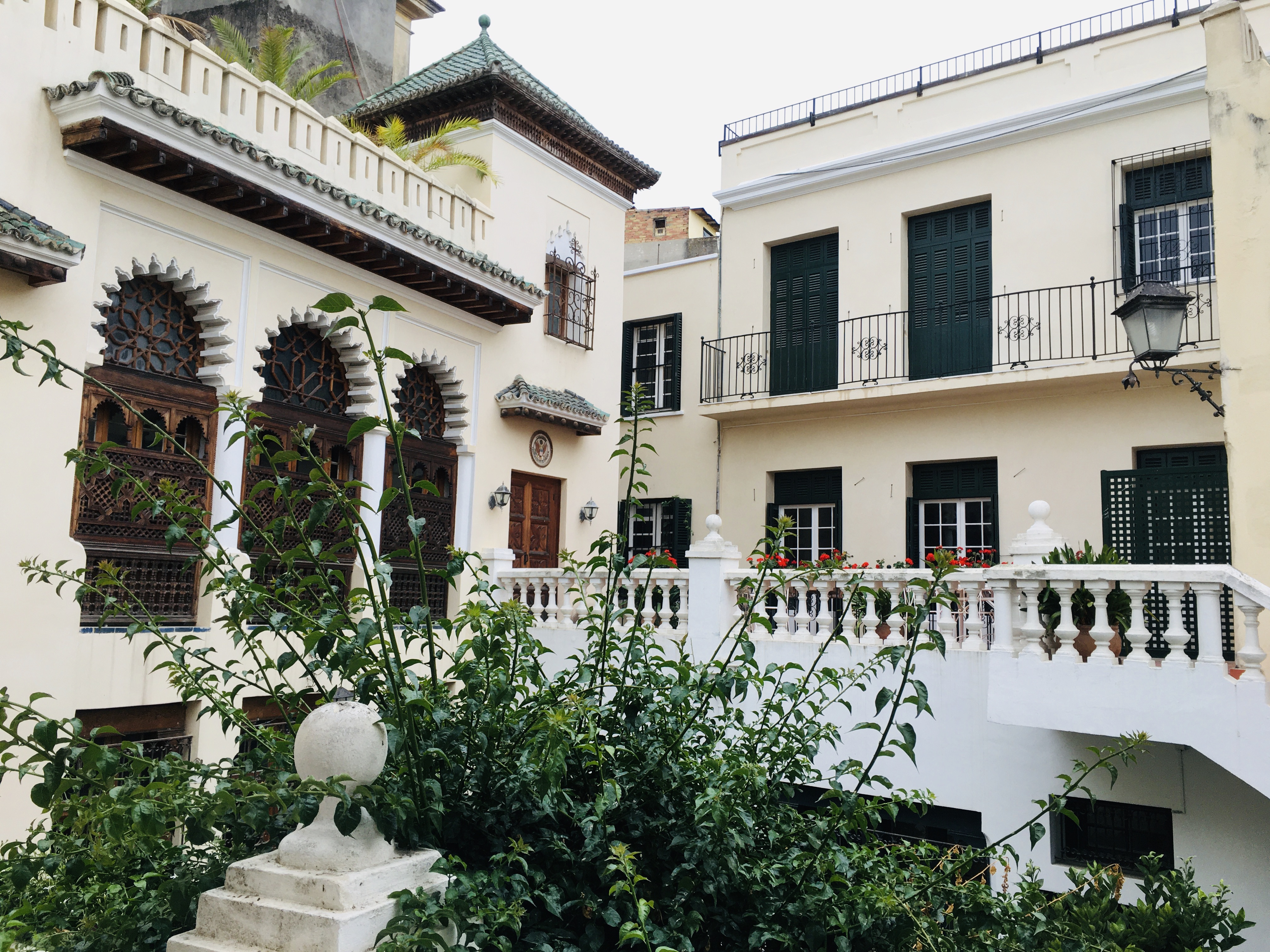
Entrance to the American Legation compound in Tangier, Morocco

The Tangier Difficulty was a diplomatic crisis that took place in February 1862 in Tangier, Morocco, during the American Civil War. The US consul in Tangier ordered the arrest of two Southerners who were en route to Cádiz, Spain to purchase coal for the Confederate vessel CSS Sumter. The local European community protested the arrest of the men, and a mob formed around the US consulate in Tangier until US Marines could be brought onshore to transport the prisoners to an American ship. Although not as severe as the Trent Affair of the previous year, the Tangier Difficulty sparked a minor diplomatic crisis between the United States, Great Britain, France, and Morocco.

== Background ==
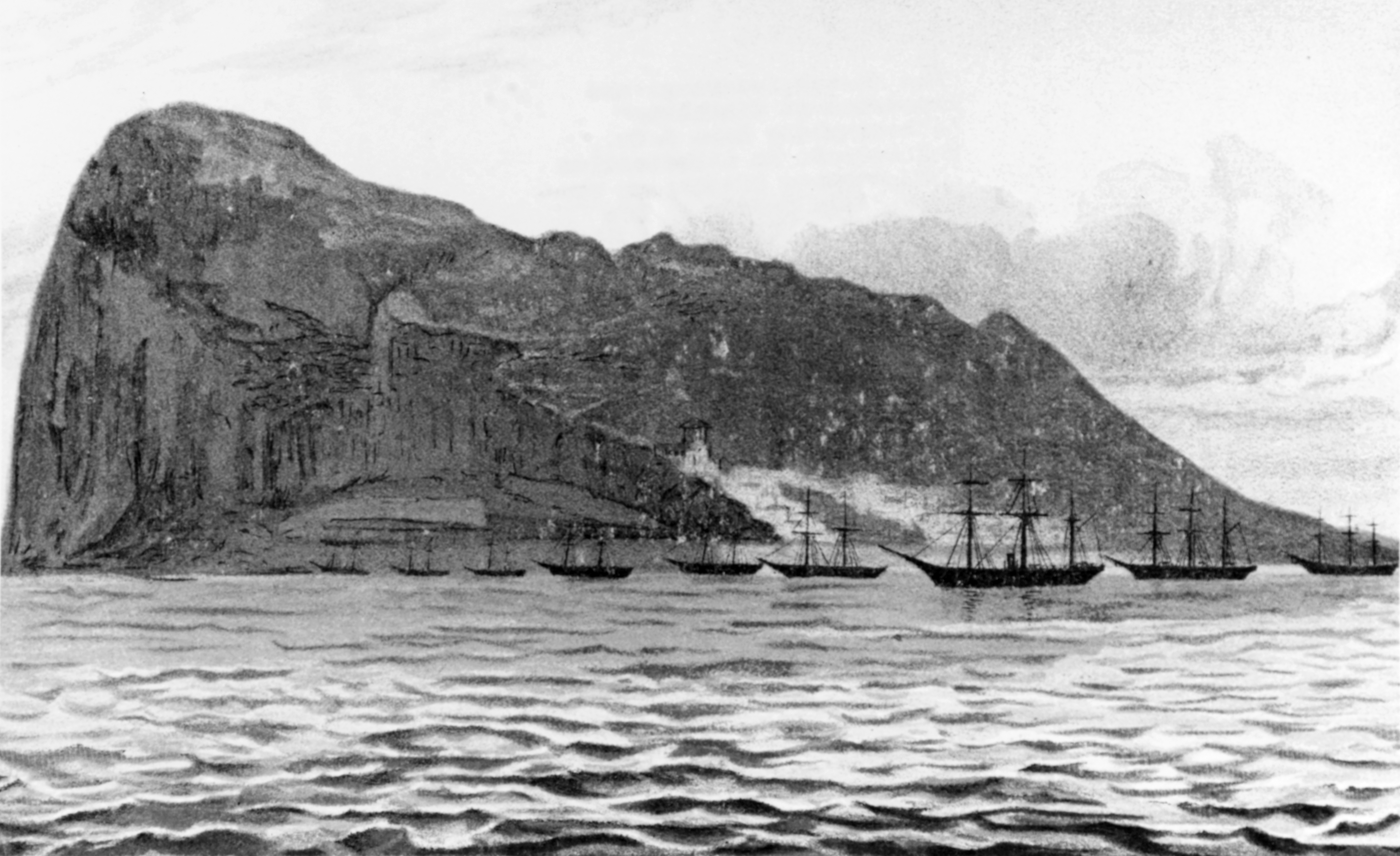
Depiction of USS Tuscarora and USS Kearsarge keeping watch on CSS Sumter at Gibraltar in 1862

At the outbreak of the American Civil War, the Confederate States Navy had very few vessels compared to the United States Navy, and the Federal fleet quickly blockaded the South's major seaports. Raphael Semmes, a former US Navy commander, joined the Confederate Navy after secession and was tasked with breaking the blockade in June 1861 with the newly commissioned CSS Sumter, a steam-powered cruiser which had formerly been the merchant ship Habana.

The Sumter operated as a successful commerce raider, capturing 18 Union vessels in its first six months of service. The ship operated in the Western Hemisphere before sailing to Europe in January 1862. The Sumter first docked at Cádiz, Spain for repairs, but it was allowed a stay of only 48 hours to conform with Spain's declaration of neutrality in the American Civil War. It moved then to Gibraltar, a major British naval base in the Mediterranean Sea, where it was allowed to stay indefinitely. The British took the position that the Confederate sailors were belligerents protected under the laws of war while visiting a neutral port, so they could not be arrested in Gibraltar, but the US consul Horatio Sprague was still able to persuade British merchants to not sell coal to the crew of the Sumter. This left the Sumter effectively trapped at Gibraltar, with severe damage to the boilers and US Navy ships waiting to pursue it as soon as it left port.

Morocco had recently been defeated in a war with Spain, and from 1860 onward the country entered a period where European powers played a greater role in its internal affairs. Tangier was an important Moroccan port city, host to diplomats and merchants from many nations, and was the de facto diplomatic capital. Morocco was the first country to recognize American independence, and the US had operated the American Legation in Tangier since 1821. The Moroccan-US treaty of friendship, which dated to 1786 and was renegotiated in 1836, gave American consuls jurisdiction over American citizens on Moroccan territory. Similarly, the European powers had negotiated treaties establishing extraterritoriality for their nationals residing in Morocco. Although the United States had friendly relations with Morocco, in the 1860s it was not an important commercial partner or serious influence on contemporary Moroccan policy.

James DeLong, the newly appointed US consul in Tangier, was a former judge and abolitionist from Ohio. DeLong had only arrived in Morocco the month prior and had never previously left the United States. DeLong was aware the Sumter was approaching Gibraltar, and was eager to see it captured. Upon hearing a rumor that Semmes and his crew might seek to buy coal in Tangier, DeLong wrote to the US consul in Gibraltar, boasting, "If they do come, I intend if possible to have them arrested and put in prison."

== Incident ==
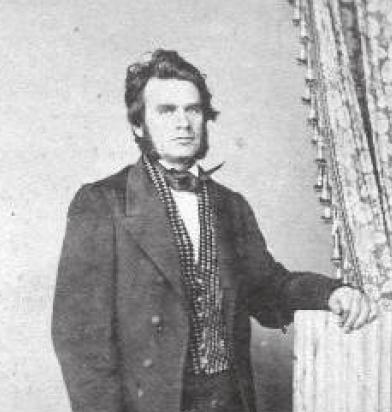
James DeLong, US consul in Tangier

On February 19, 1862, two Southerners, Thomas Tate Tunstall and Henry Myers came ashore at Tangier, and the US Consul James DeLong ordered them arrested. Tunstall, an Alabamian, was the former US Consul in Cádiz who had been dismissed from his post in July 1861 due to his alleged Confederate sympathies. Lieutenant Myers, a Georgian and former US Navy officer, was now serving as Confederate paymaster aboard the Sumter. Myers had been ordered by Semmes to travel to Cádiz and purchase coal there, since the British had refused to supply any at Gibraltar. Tunstall, who spoke Spanish and was familiar with Cádiz having served there as US consul, volunteered to accompany Myers. The two men departed Gibraltar on board the Villa de Malaga, a French steamship that traveled the Gibraltar-Tangier-Cádiz route.

When the ship made a regularly-scheduled stopover in Tangier, the two Southerners disembarked and went to visit a friend of Myers. While they were returning to the ship, DeLong had them arrested with the cooperation of Moroccan soldiers commanded by the niyaba (foreign minister) Mohammed Bargach. The prisoners were then taken to the US Consulate. The US diplomatic service took the position that "Consuls enjoy in Morocco an almost absolute jurisdiction over the persons of their fellow-citizens or subjects to the exclusion of the local jurisdiction of the town or that of the Emperor," and since the United States did not recognize the government of the Confederacy, DeLong was empowered to arrest these two citizens of the United States on suspicion of "treason.. [and] robbery on the high seas." DeLong's justification for arresting the men was based on the 1836 American-Moroccan treaty, which stated that the American consul should have “all the privileges which the Consuls of any other Nation enjoy,” combined with the 1856 Anglo-Moroccan treaty which gave the British consul the right to request Moroccan soldiers to arrest British subjects in the country.

Myers gave an alias, but was quickly discovered to be a Confederate navy officer after DeLong heard Tunstall call his companion by name. DeLong consulted the register of US Navy officers who had left their posts at the outset of the Civil War and found Myers' information. Tunstall plead innocence and offered to take an oath of loyalty to the United States government, which DeLong refused to accept. Both prisoners tried to bribe their guards, and Myers broke out of his constraints and jumped out of a second-story window before being recaptured and beaten by the Moroccan guards. At one point, the prisoners were put in chains.

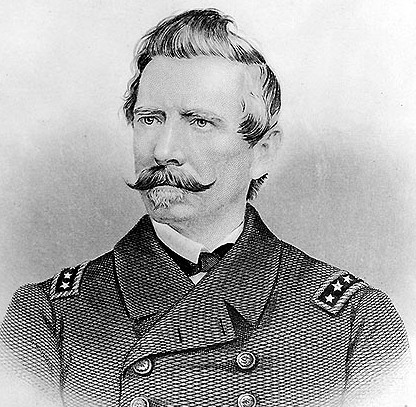
Raphael Semmes, captain of CSS Sumter

DeLong reported that British diplomats were unhappy with his actions, stating that: "a great many of them are extremely insulting to the Federals and are nearly all on the side of the rebels." In 1861, the Trent Affair had caused a diplomatic crisis between the United States and Britain, when USS San Jacinto stopped the British mail steamer RMS Trent while at sea and removed the two newly appointed Confederate envoys to Europe (James Murray Mason and John Slidell) who were on board. Tense relations ensued between Britain and the United States even after the envoys were released in December 1861. As such, the memory of the Trent Affair was still fresh in the minds of the British when DeLong arrested another two Southerners in Tangier just a few weeks later.

When news of the arrest reached Semmes, he protested to the governor of Gibraltar and to the Moroccan government by way of the British consul in Tangier. Semmes believed that British influence could be exerted on Morocco to free the prisoners: "Morocco just now, because of the guarantee of her loan by Great Britain, is of course anxious to please her patron." However, the British consul in Tangier was under strict orders to maintain neutrality in the American Civil War.

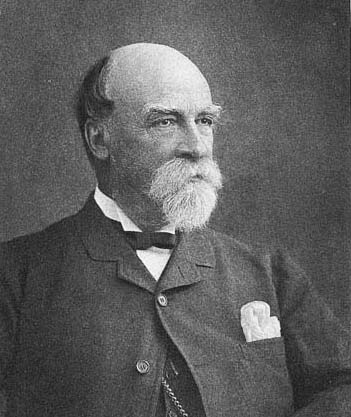
Sir John Hay Drummond Hay, the British consul at Tangier during the crisis

DeLong became paranoid that there was "a secret movement at foot" among the Europeans to free his prisoners, and he requested a US Navy ship come to Tangier to remove the two captives. The USS Ino traveled to Tangier with orders to collect the prisoners and bring them back to the United States. The Ino arrived in Tangier on the 26th, and after meeting the local governor, the ship's captain Josiah P. Creesy went to the US Consulate. However, in the meantime a large crowd of Europeans residing in Tangier had surrounded the consulate and demanded the release of the prisoners. The crowd was made up of English, French, Spanish and Italians, and no Moroccans took part in the demonstration. The demonstrators numbered between 200 and 400 people, roughly one third of the city's foreign residents at the time; they cheered "freedom" in Spanish (the main trade and diplomatic language in Morocco at the time) and called Tunstall by his name. As a former consul from the nearby port of Cádiz, Tunstall was a familiar face to some of the Europeans in Tangier, who were sympathetic towards him and did not like to see a Westerner under arrest by Moroccan guards. Additionally, most of the European community in Tangier were merchants who had been affected by the rise in cotton prices caused by the Union blockade of Southern ports. Creesy called for support from the marines aboard his ship, but when the US Marines and more Navy officers landed they were confined to the custom house.

Creesy and DeLong then passed "through the greatest crowd of rabble that in all probability ever congregated in the streets of Tangier" and went to complain to the local governor about the situation. DeLong threatened to resign as consul and withdraw the US consulate in Morocco if the governor would not consent to the removal of the prisoners to the Ino. In the late afternoon, Tunstall and Myers were removed from the consulate and taken to the Ino, with the crowd not offering any resistance. The British Consul, John Hay Drummond Hay, addressed the assembled crowd and told them the matter did not involve European nations. The Ino sailed to Cádiz, then transferred the prisoners to the merchant ship Harvest Home on March 5, which returned them to America.

== Reactions ==
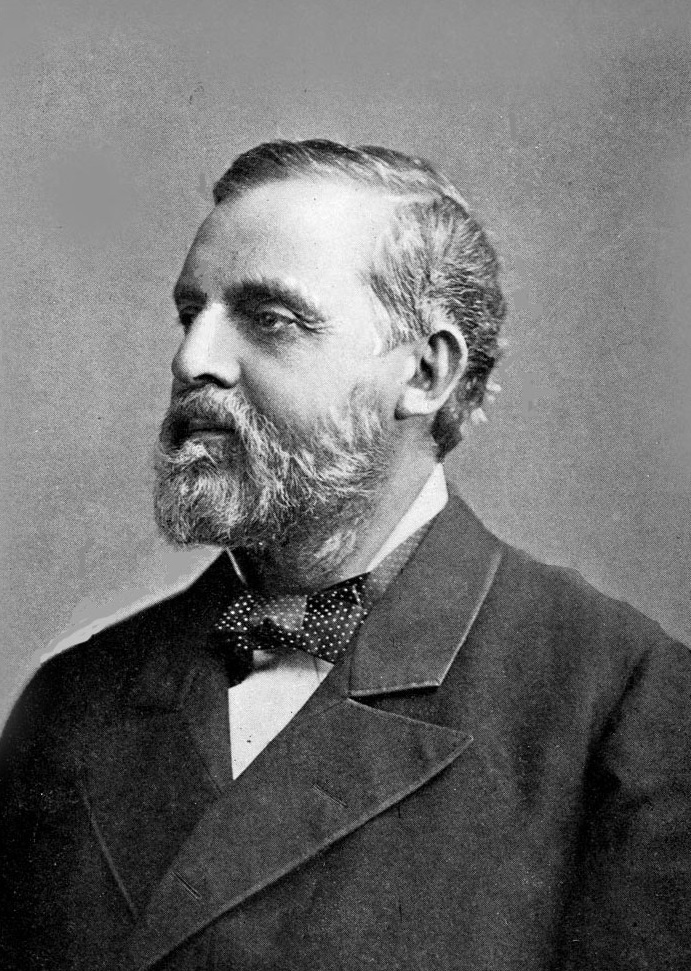
Horatio J. Perry, US chargé d'affaires in Madrid

While the Moroccan authorities cooperated with DeLong and arrested the two men at his request, by February 25 Semmes' appeals had reached the governor of Tangier, who asked DeLong to release the prisoners. DeLong appealed directly to the governor in the meeting on the 26th, and was able to convince him to allow the prisoners to be transferred to the American ship. Despite relying on the cooperation of the Moroccan authorities, the American diplomats involved in the crisis took a condescending view towards their hosts. DeLong referred to Moroccans as "semi-barbarians", and the US Chargé d'affaires in Madrid, Horatio J. Perry (the ranking diplomatic officer in the affair) reported that the "rules which obtain among civilized nations are not applicable to the Mohammedan or semi-barbarous powers." Perry dismissed the Moroccans' intelligence and knowledge of outside world events, writing that "The only peril which we could run of losing any part of the friendship of the authorities of Morocco might have been by the display of some weakness or indecision on the part of our consul whether toward [the Moroccans] or toward the representatives and subjects of other foreign powers." After the events had passed, Sultan Muhammad IV of Morocco issued a royal decree supporting the Union and confirming the right of the US consul to arrest those in rebellion against the United States.

When they were first arrested, the prisoners appealed to the French consul for protection, but the consul chose not to intervene, stating that when the men disembarked the French steamer they were no longer under French protection. Semmes attempted to use British influence in Morocco to obtain the release of the prisoners. Many Confederates hoped for British recognition of the Confederacy, and Semmes appealed to the British Consul in Tangier, John Hay Drummond Hay, to intervene in the matter. However, Hay replied to Semmes that: "her Britannic Majesty's Government have decided on observing a strict neutrality in the present conflict between the Northern and Southern States; it is therefore incumbent on her Majesty's officers to avoid anything like undue interference in any questions affecting the interests of either party which do not concern the British Government; and though I do not refuse to accede to your request to deliver the letter to the Moorish authorities, I think it my duty to signify distinctly to the latter my intention to abstain from expressing an opinion regarding the course to be pursued by Morocco."

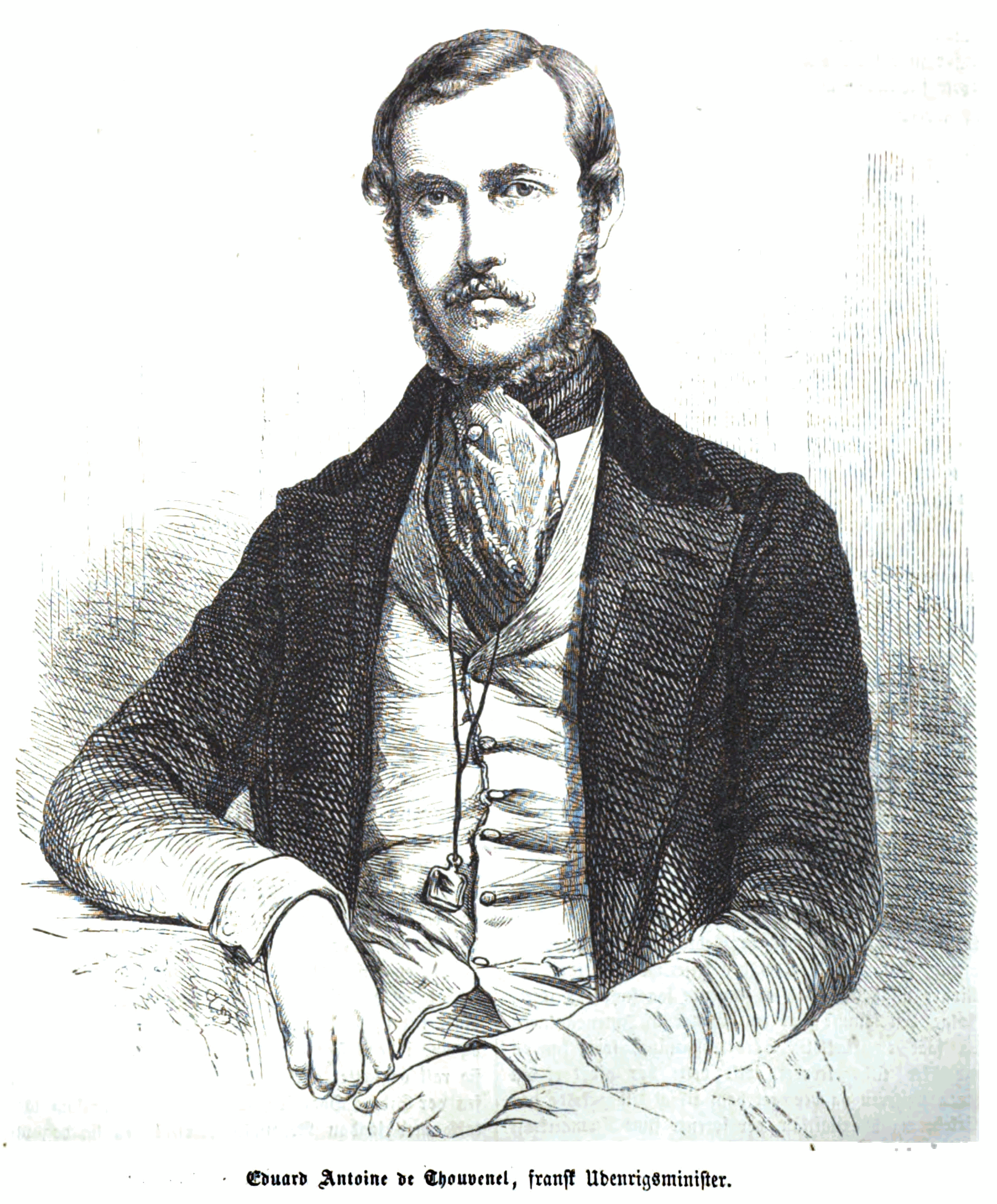
The French foreign minister, Édouard de Thouvenel

Later, when appeals to Britain for intervention didn't succeed, James M. Mason, now the Confederate representative in London, suggested to his colleague John Slidell in Paris that they complain to France, on the basis that "these gentlemen [Myers and Tunstall], being passengers on board a French packet steamer and having landed only for a walk on shore (animo revertendi), whilst the ship remained at Tangier, might be considered as remaining under the protection of the French flag." However, Slidell reported to Semmes in March that the French incorrectly believed that the prisoners had already been released, even though at this point they were already en route back to America. The French consul in Tangier believed that DeLong had overstepped his authority, and complained to the US government through the French minister of foreign affairs, Édouard de Thouvenel. US Secretary of State William H. Seward formally replied to the French, defending DeLong's actions and describing how the treaties that Western powers had made with Morocco's government gave them the right to arrest citizens on Moroccan soil. He reasserted that though Tunstall and Myers had arrived on a French ship, by leaving the boat they had become subject to Moroccan law and could be arrested as rebels by order of the American consul.

DeLong's account of the affair was self-aggrandizing, melodramatic, and paranoid. He believed the other foreign diplomats had been conspiring against him, and he wrote a circular letter to all the European diplomats of Tangier accusing them of standing by when his "life was placed in danger by an armed populace". Creesy, the Navy officer who was with DeLong at the time the mob surrounded the consulate, related a much less dramatic version of events, and in his reports of the incident did not mention the crowd being armed. DeLong's actions created a bad impression in Washington, and president Abraham Lincoln withdrew DeLong's Senate confirmation for the Tangier posting, substituting Jesse McMath as consul in his place.

After the prisoners were taken back to the United States, Semmes abandoned his diplomatic attempts to free them. As the Sumter was badly damaged and could not be easily repaired, he abandoned it in Gibraltar and moved on to Britain with most of the Sumter's crew to take possession of the newly launched CSS Alabama, which would become his most famous command. In 1863, following further diplomatic correspondence between the United States and Morocco, the sultan issued an order to his governors, stating: "If any vessel of the so-called Confederate States enters your port, it shall not be received, but you must order it away at once, as they are not allowed entrance, because we do not know them and they have no consul by whom they may be known to us".

== Aftermath ==
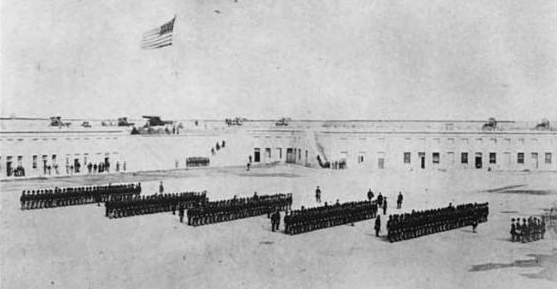
Fort Warren garrison in formation during the Civil War

Myers and Tunstall arrived in Boston Harbor on April 18, 1862, where they were delivered to the United States Marshals Service and imprisoned at Fort Warren, Massachusetts. Tunstall and Myers had been kept in leg irons for the duration of their journey and not given a change of clothing. When questioned, the men swore they were innocent civilians, but Semmes' dispatches make it clear that he had sent Myers on a mission to procure coal and Tunstall had volunteered to go along. In an article written after the war and published in the Confederate Veteran magazine, Myers admitted that his mission to Cádiz was of a military nature.

Tunstall was ordered to be released on May 5 by William Seward. He returned to the South and served on a Confederate blockade runner, but was captured by Federal forces and imprisoned. Released on the condition that he would go to Europe for the duration of the Civil War, Tunstall returned to Alabama in 1866 and later served as the US consul in San Salvador. He later moved to El Paso, Texas and died in 1918 at age 95.

Myers was held at Fort Warren for four months before he was taken to Fortress Monroe in Virginia and exchanged as a prisoner of war. He later moved to Jacksonville, Florida and was employed by the municipal waterworks before his death in 1901.

After being recalled from Morocco, DeLong was appointed as the US consul in Aux Cayes, Haiti, serving there for eight years, before moving to Independence, Kansas, where he was elected mayor. DeLong died in Kansas in 1891.

== See also ==
- Diplomacy of the American Civil War
- Morocco–United States relations
