= Mordecai Myers (Georgia politician) =

American politician (1794 – 1865)

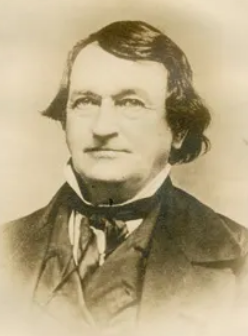
- Myers pictured around 1845
- Born: November 9, 1794; South Carolina, U.S.
- Died: February 21, 1865 (aged 70)
- Resting place: Laurel Grove Cemetery
- Spouse: Sarah Henrietta Cohen (–1865; his death)

Mordecai Myers (November 9, 1794 – February 21, 1865) was a 19th-century American politician and landowner in Savannah, Georgia, United States.

== Life and career ==
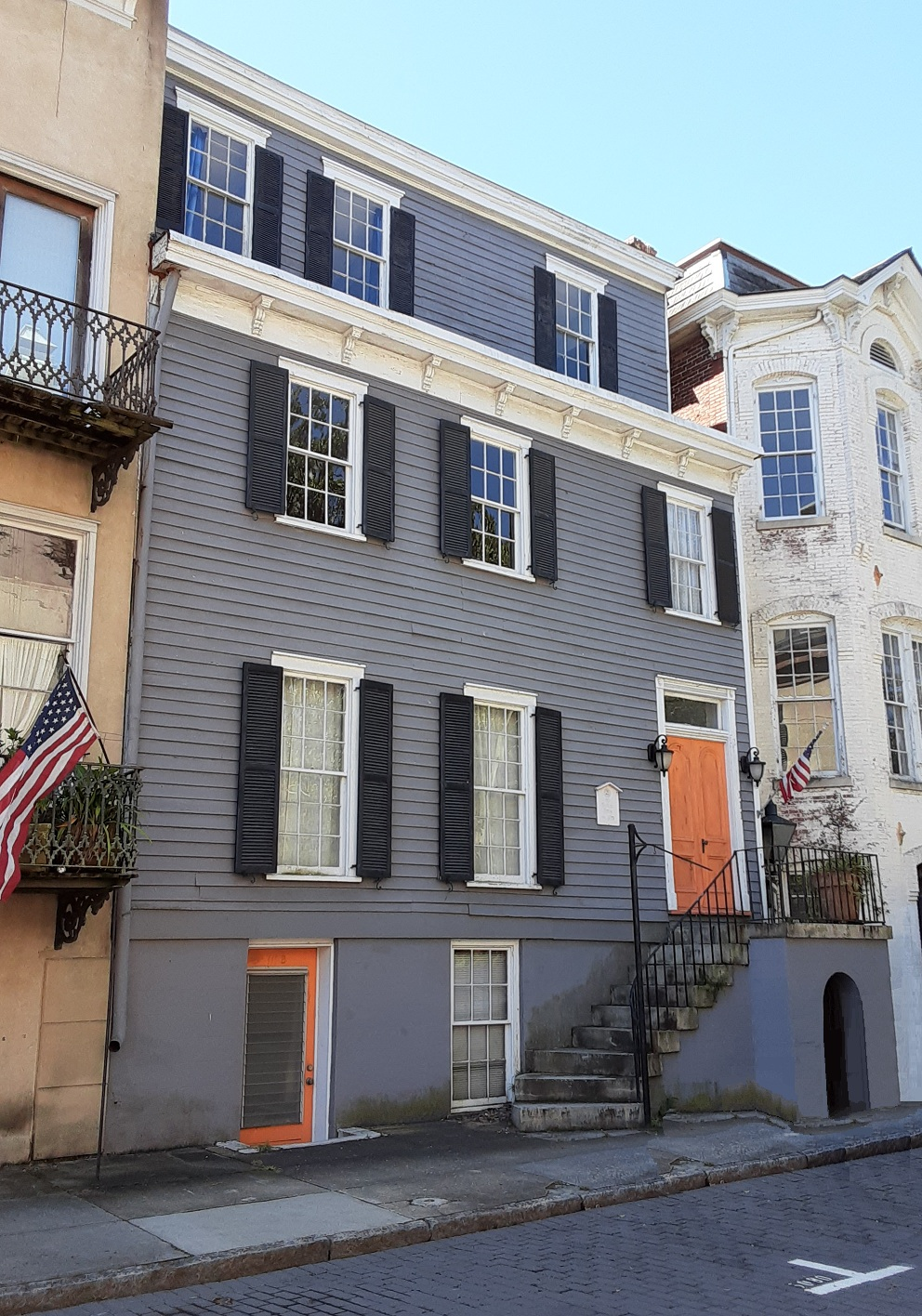
What is today known as the Mordecai Myers House, at 111 West Perry Street in Savannah. The third story was added fifteen years after Mordecai's death

Named for his paternal grandfather, Myers was born in 1794 in South Carolina to medical doctor Levi Myers and Frances Minis, who (along with thirteen other members of his family) drowned when the family home in Georgetown was swept off its blocks into the ocean during a hurricane on September 27, 1822. It is believed that 28-year-old Mordecai was the only survivor, and that he buried the victims.

It is understood that Myers, like his father, graduated from Princeton University in 1812.

After graduating, Myers was taken by South Carolina governor Lemuel J. Alston onto his staff as an Aide-de-Camp and private secretary with a colonel ranking. Between 1812 and 1814, Myers lived with Alston and his family.

After being admitted to the South Carolina bar, Myers married Sarah Henrietta Cohen, daughter of Solomon Cohen Sr. and Bella Moses. They had twelve children, not all of whom survived to adulthood. Son Henry became a lieutenant-commander in the United States Navy.

He was elected a member of the Union Society of Savannah in 1825. The society's role was in support of orphaned male children. Over the next few years, he was on the board of directors of the State Bank, was secretary of the Association of Friends of Ireland in Savannah, and in 1830 he was making announcements for the city council.

In the 1830 census of Chatham County, Myers was listed as being a general officer, and also as having five males and two females in his household.

In 1833, Myers had built today's 111 West Perry Street in Savannah's Orleans Square.

Myers was elected to the Georgia House of Representatives in 1837, and the following year he was elected unanimously as chairman to the board of health.

In 1839, he was a founding member of the Georgia Historical Society, along with his brother-in-law Solomon Cohen Jr.

On 1845, Myers sold land in Savannah's Franklin Ward to Abram Minis. Minis built today's 20–22 Montgomery Street, in Franklin Square, the following year.

In the 1850 Cobb County census, he is listed as being a farmer, owning 20,000 acres (8,100 ha).

== Death ==
Myers died in 1865, aged 70. He is interred in Savannah's Laurel Grove Cemetery, alongside his wife, who survived him by 21 years. He had moved the remains of his parents from their burial plot in Georgetown to Laurel Grove in 1856.
