= CSS Sumter =

Steam cruiser of the Confederate States Navy

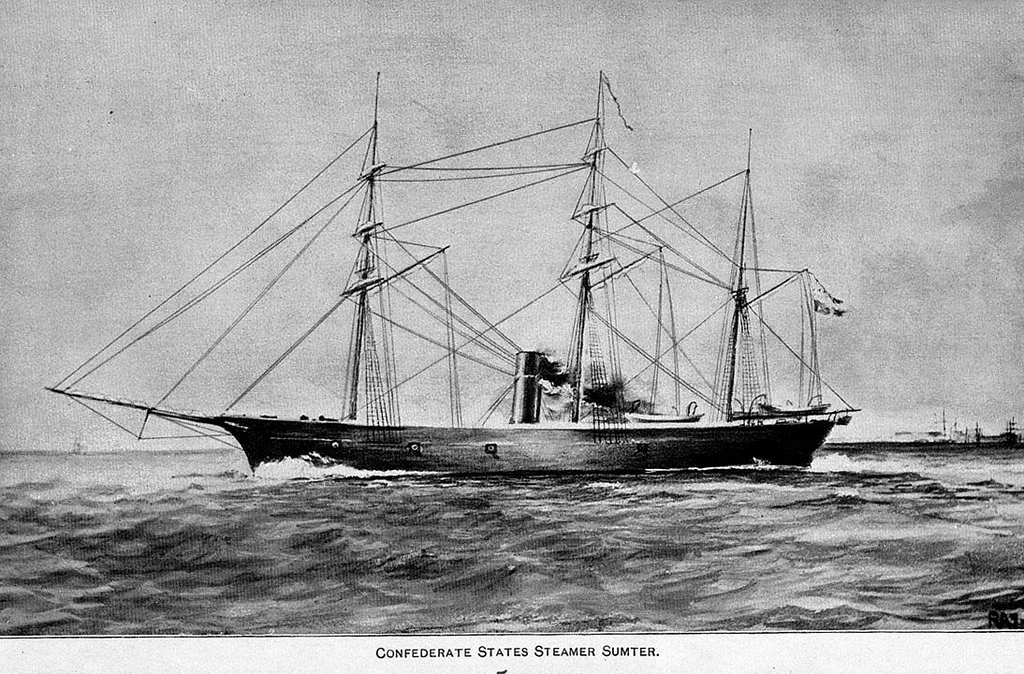
- CSS Sumter

History

Confederate States of America
- Laid down: 1859
- Christened: Habana
- Acquired: April 1861
- Commissioned: 3 June 1861 as CSS Sumter
- Fate: Sold 19 December 1862 (renamed Gibraltar). Foundered on the Dogger Bank 14 February 1867.

General characteristics
- Displacement: 473 tons
- Length: 184 ft (56 m)
- Beam: 30 ft (9.1 m)
- Draft: 12 ft (3.7 m)
- Propulsion: Steam, Sail
- Speed: 10 knots (19 km/h; 12 mph)
- Complement: 18
- Armament: 1 × 8-inch shell gun; 4 × 32-pounder guns

CSS Sumter, converted from the 1859-built merchant steamer Habana, was the first steam cruiser of the Confederate States Navy during the American Civil War. She operated as a commerce raider in the Caribbean and in the Atlantic Ocean against Union merchant shipping between July and December 1861, taking eighteen prizes, but was trapped in Gibraltar by Union Navy warships. Decommissioned, she was sold in 1862 to the British office of a Confederate merchant and renamed Gibraltar, successfully running the Union blockade in 1863 and surviving the war.

== Construction and merchant service before the American Civil War ==
The wood-hulled merchant steamship Habana was built in 1859 at the Philadelphia shipyard of Birely & Lynn for Captain James McConnell's New Orleans & Havana Steam Navigation Co. (Note: "Byerly" probably a mis-spelling) She was powered by a 400-horsepower steam engine made by Neafie, Levy & Co, also of Philadelphia, driving a single propeller and was also rigged for sail, generally described as bark rigged. She was variously reported to measure 499 or 520 gross registered tons, with a length overall of 184 ft (56 m), beam of 30 ft (9.1 m) and a draft of 12 ft (3.7 m). Habana was launched on 18 May 1859, performed well on trials and was considered a fast ship in subsequent mail service out of New Orleans.

== Confederate States Navy service ==
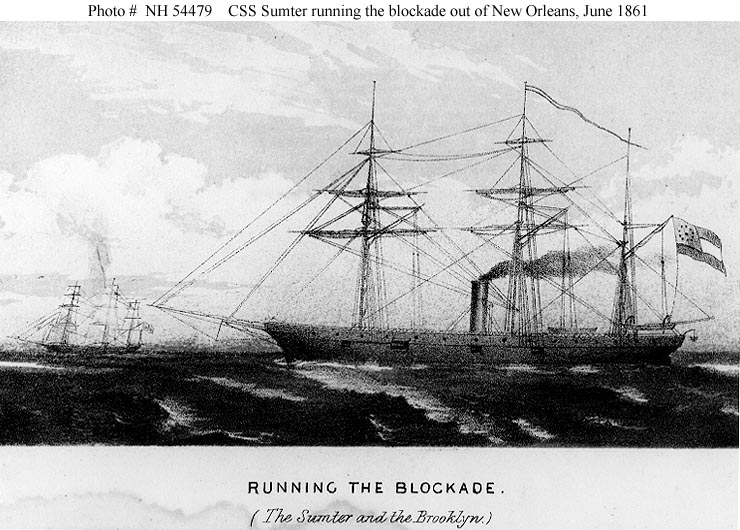
A drawing of Sumter running the blockade out of New Orleans in 1861.

Habana was purchased by the Confederate government at New Orleans in April 1861, converted to a cruiser and placed under the command of Raphael Semmes. Renamed Sumter, she was commissioned into the Confederate States Navy on 3 June 1861 and broke through the Federal blockade of the Mississippi River mouth later that month.

Eluding the pursuing sloop-of-war USS Brooklyn, the pioneering Confederate Navy commerce raider captured eight U.S.-flagged merchant ships in waters near Cuba early in July 1861, then moved south to the Brazilian coast off Maranhão, where she took two more ships. Two additional merchantman fell to Sumter in September and October 1861. While coaling at Martinique in mid-November, she was blockaded by the Union sloop of war Iroquois, but was able to escape to sea at night. Sumter captured another six ships from late November 1861 into January 1862 while cruising from the western hemisphere to European waters. Damaged during a severe Atlantic storm, she anchored at Cádiz, Spain, on 4 January 1862, where she was allowed only to make necessary repairs without refueling, and was then forced to sail to British-held Gibraltar.

Unable to make more comprehensive repairs or purchase coal there, Sumter remained at anchor in Gibraltar watched by a succession of U.S. Navy warships, among them the sloop-of-war USS Kearsarge and the gunboat USS Chippewa. A minor diplomatic crisis, the Tangier Difficulty, took place in February 1862 when the ship's paymaster, accompanied by the former US consul in Cadiz, were arrested as rebels by the US consul in Tangier, Morocco. The local European population mobbed the US consulate in Tangier and demanded the release of the two men, who were transferred to a US Navy ship by an escort of US Marines and safely taken back to America. Semmes and many of his officers were then reassigned to the new cruiser CSS Alabama, while most of the crew was paid off, leaving only a skeleton crew aboard her.

In October 1862, acting captain Midshipman William Andrews was shot dead in his quarters aboard the Sumter by acting master's mate Joseph Hester. Hester alleged that Andrews had planned to sail Sumter to Algeciras, Spain and surrender her to a U.S. Navy ship there. Hester was arrested by British authorities, and a coroner's jury returned a verdict of wilful murder. Hester's allegations of Andrews' supposed treachery was not corroborated by the rest of the crew.

== Blockade runner Gibraltar ==
Sumter was disarmed and sold at auction on 19 December 1862 to the Liverpool office of Fraser, Trenholm and Company. Sumter's sail plan was changed to a ship rig and she continued her service to the Confederacy under British colors as the blockade runner Gibraltar.

Though her career as a warship had lasted barely six months, Sumter had taken eighteen prizes, of which she burned eight, and released or bonded nine; only one was recaptured. The diversion of Union warships to blockade her had been in itself of significant service to the Confederate cause.

As Gibraltar, she ran at least once into Wilmington, North Carolina, under Capt. E. C. Reid, a Southerner. He sailed from Liverpool on 3 July 1863 with a pair of 22-ton Blakely rifles and other valuable munitions, returning with a full load of cotton. The beginning of this voyage is recorded only because the United States Consul in Liverpool passionately protested Gibraltar's being allowed to sail (ostensibly for Nassau), days before formal customs clearance: "She is one of the privileged class and not held down like other vessels to strict rules and made to conform to regulations." The arrival at Wilmington is also a matter of record because of the accidental sinking of the Confederate transport steamer Sumter by Confederate gunners at Fort Moultrie near Charleston in late August 1863. Until November 1863, U.S. naval intelligence understandably confused this ship with the former commerce raider.

The last official report of her appears to have been by the U.S. Consul at Liverpool on 10 July 1864: "The pirate Sumter (called Gibraltar) is laid up at Birkenhead." Gibraltar was sold at auction at Liverpool on orders from the U.S. Consul on 14 June 1866. She was purchased for £1,150 and based in Hull, East Riding of Yorkshire, employed in the Baltic trade. On 10 February 1867 she sprang a leak whilst on a voyage from Helsingborg, Sweden to Grimsby, Lincolnshire, and foundered on the Dogger Bank on 14 February 1867, with her crew being rescued by a fishing smack.

== See also ==
- Blockade runners of the American Civil War
- Confederate States Navy
- Union Navy
- Bibliography of American Civil War naval history

== Sources ==
- Semmes, Raphael, The Cruise of the Alabama and the Sumter, Carleton, 1864, Digitized by Digital Scanning Incorporated, 2001, ISBN 1-58218-353-8.
- See The Cornhill Magazine, No. 6 (Jul–Dec 1862) pp. 187–205: "The Cruise of the Confederate Ship 'Sumter': [From the Private Journal of an Officer]". A swaggering account, unsigned.
- This article contains public domain material from the Naval History and Heritage Command, entry here.
