= Bombardment of Salé (1851) =

Naval attack

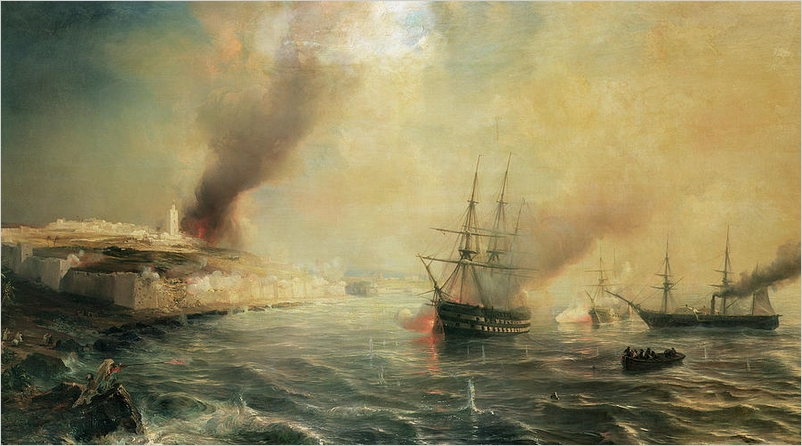
- Bombardment of Salé by Jean Antoine Théodore de Gudin
Date	26 – 27 November 1851
Location	Salé, Morocco 34.04°N 6.83°W
Result	French military victory; Morocco agreed to pay 100,000 francs to the French on 29 November 1851 to avoid further conflict.; Moroccan political victory; France had desired a revolt against the governor of Salé to force repayment and avoid destruction of the city, but this did not occur.

Belligerents
(France) French Republic	Morocco

Commanders and leaders
(France) Louis Henri (France) Louis Dubourdieu	Abd al-Rahman; Abdelhadi Zniber

Strength
5 battleships	40 batteries Several gunners Several fortifications

Casualties and losses
4 killed 18 wounded 2 ships damaged	18–22 killed 47 wounded Fortifications damaged

The Bombardment of Salé was a French naval attack against the Moroccan city of Salé that took place between 26 and 27 November 1851. After seven hours of fighting, the Moroccan artillery suffered severe damage, and the French bombarded the city through the night, damaging the city's infrastructure and the Great Mosque of Salé.

The bombardment occurred outside any state of war, and regarded an incident from 1 April 1851 in which the residents of Salé looted a cache of goods which had been rescued from a capsized French merchant ship. The French requested repayment, the Moroccans did not respond. In late November, a French squadron sailed to the city to demand repayment, else they would bombard the city. The Moroccans did not acquiesce, and both sides prepared for battle. The French opened fire on the morning of 26 November. During seven hours of clashes, the Moroccan artillery of Salé supported by that of Rabat and led by the Abdelhadi Zniber suffered significant damage. The French squadron commanded by Rear Admiral Louis Dubourdieu bombarded the city until the next day, seriously damaging the city's infrastructure, including the Great Mosque which was seriously affected.

French losses were minimal, with only four dead and 18 wounded. Conversely, 18 to 22 Moroccans died and 47 were wounded, two-thirds of whom were civilians. The outcome of the confrontation, although undecided following the withdrawal of French forces, is claimed as a victory by each of the belligerents.

== Background ==
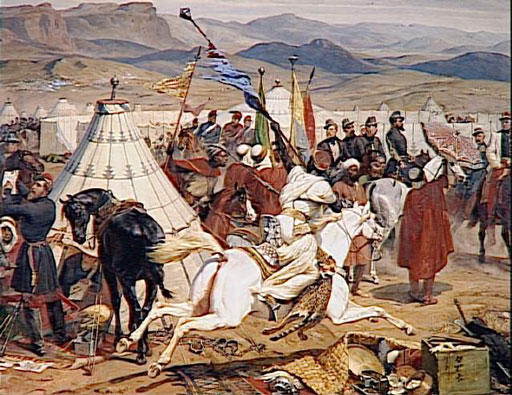
The Battle of Isly in 1844

After the French conquest of Algeria, Emir Abd al-Qadir declared war against France, and requested assistance from Sultan Abd al-Rahman of Morocco. When the Sultan responded favorably, it triggered the Franco-Moroccan War. France sent warships to bombard Tangier on 6 August 1844, destroying large parts of the city and its defenses. The French then bombarded Essaouira, and occupied the Iles Purpuraires. After the French army defeated the Moroccan cavalry at the Battle of Isly on 14 August 1844, Sultan Abd al-Rahman asked for peace with France, leading to the signing of the Treaty of Tangier on 10 September 1844. Morocco's defeat caused a revolt in Rabat; in Salé, the city's nobility, known as the Sharif, sent a letter to the Sultan complaining about the lack of weapons and ammunition in the city.

Meanwhile, the French government's anger against Morocco was increasing. A series of incidents in October 1849 damaged relations between both countries; a series of assassinations directed at the French frontier had occurred, and the French Consul had requested the dismissal of Pacha Ouchda, who was believed to have caused these issues. From 1845 to 1851, Morocco had a serious agricultural crisis caused by a drought, resulting in crop failure. The people of Morocco were suffering as the price of wheat and barley reached unprecedented heights. In Salé, many people were starving, and the agricultural crisis and anger towards France ultimately led to the bombardment of Salé.

== Preparations ==
On 1 April 1851, a French cargo ship carrying 98 tons of goods from Gibraltar to Rabat was capsized near the coast of Salé. A few tons of goods were rescued, and were stored in the city for safekeeping. Salé turned out to be less than safe, however; by the next day, hundreds of townspeople were scavenging and stealing the goods. The thieves were thwarted by Abdelhadi Zniber, but only temporarily. By the end of the raids, the French had lost 11,391 franc germinals worth of goods.

French diplomat Nicolas Prosper Bourée reported the situation in Salé to the French, and accused the people in the city of piracy. Bourée recommended sending military forces to the city; the French government obliged.

After six to eight months of waiting, there was no response from the sultan. At the end of the mission of Bou-Selam Ben Ali, Minister of Foreign Affairs of Morocco, reported the situation. He accused the inhabitants of Salé of an act of piracy and recommends sending a French squadron "to teach them a lesson". With France experiencing ministerial crises, the government decided to obtain compensation by force. Diplomatic ties were severed between the two countries and the consul Jules Doazan, residing in Rabat, was dismissed from his post.

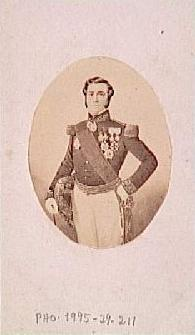
Louis Dubourdieu was tasked by the French Secretary of the Navy to take action against Salé, and five vessels were assigned to him.

On 10 November 1851, the French Secretary of the Navy tasked Louis Dubourdieu with the execution of the action against Salé, and five vessels were assigned to him in this regard: Henri IV (armed with 100 cannons and captained by Louis Henri de Gueydon), the Sané (14 cannons), the Gomer (14 cannons), the Narval (4 cannons), and the Caton (6 cannons). The fleet gathered in Cádiz on 19 November, and after being supplied with food and coal, sailed for Salé on 21 November.

== Bombardment ==
On 24 November, some of the French ships traveled to Tangier, where they picked up consul Julius Doazan and his secretary, Fleurat, on Narval. Later that evening, Caton reached Salé and offered safe passage to Rabat for the British consul Elton and his family, in anticipation of the bombardment of the city. The following day, at 11:00 a.m, Caton anchored between the cities of Rabat and Salé. Its commander demanded an apology over the thefts and raids and immediate repayment for the stolen goods, under threat of bombardment. The rais in the ports of both cities promised to answer to the French demands within three hours. Two hours later, all of the French ships had reached the mouth of the Bou Regreg, between Rabat and Salé.

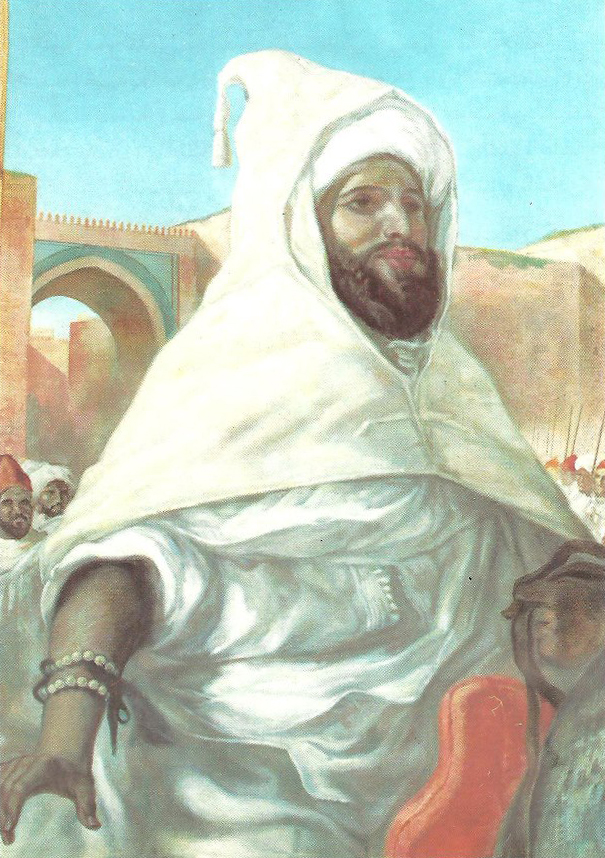
The 'Alawid Sultan of Morocco, Abd al-Rahman

The French crews of Henri IV received a telegraph from Admiral de Gueydon, suggesting that the bombardment of the city would begin soon, which the crews welcomed with enthusiasm. By then, a large crowd of people in Rabat and Salé had gathered to observe the French ships after they were spotted by Moroccan artillery operators. Admiral de Gueydon decided against starting the bombardment until consul Elton was aboard Caton; the consul did not come aboard the ship until four hours later. At dawn on 26 November though, the British steamer Janus joined Caton, and took the consul as its passenger. The Moroccan soldiers in both Rabat and Salé prepared to repel the French attack, and armed themselves with artillery. On the French side, Sané had moved to the fort at the entrance to the Bou Regreg river; Henri IV was a short distance from the Moroccan batteries north of Salé. Gomer moved to a suitable position to attack, and both Narval and Caton would provide logistical support.

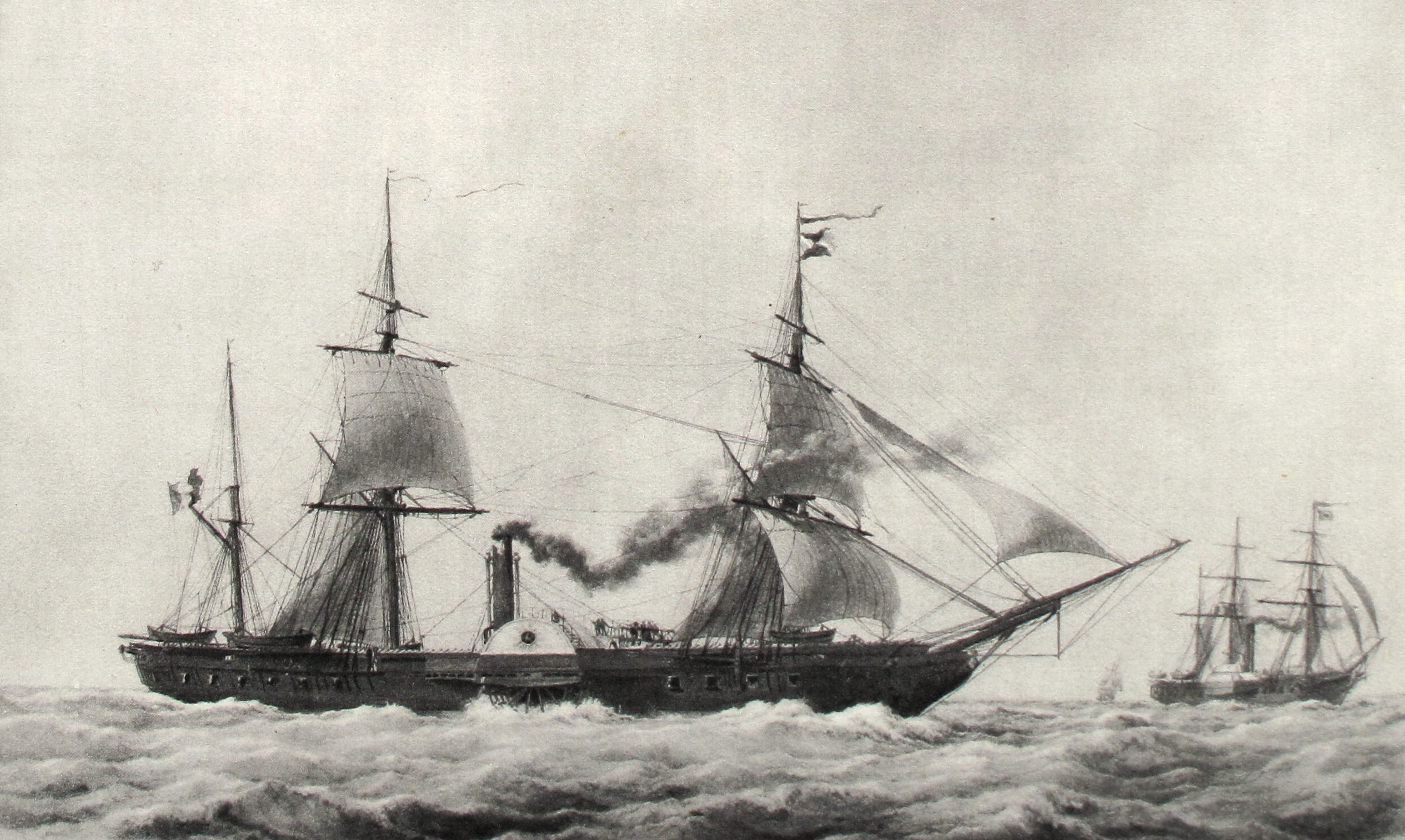
Gomer, a steam frigate with 14 cannons

The French opened fire on the forts of Salé at 10:00 a.m, and the Moroccans retaliated instantly with forty batteries of artillery weapons. An hour into the confrontation, the batteries in Salé were destroyed, and the artillery in Rabat were damaged to a level that they became almost useless, however Moroccan reinforcements arrived. The French fire intensified, but at 3:30 p.m., the damaged batteries were removed from the city by Moroccan forces; however, resistance did not stop until 5:00 p.m. Sané and Gomer, lacking ammunition, withdrew from the battle, while Henri IV continued its barrage on the city until 7:00 a.m. in the next morning.

== Aftermath ==
The following day, Dubourdieu sent a report to the Minister of War describing the French losses. Henri IV took several hits, with 1 dead and 9 wounded. The Sané suffered more damage than the Gomer, but neither was seriously damaged. Three men were killed on the Sané, and nine were wounded.

Quite a number of enemy cannonballs hit our buildings; but most of them hit the masts and rigging. The Henri IV was passed through in several places, and it carries reputable footprints in its wall; its main topmast was cut by a cannonball. The Sané suffered more damage than the Gomer, but it did not have any serious damage. Fortunately, our losses were small. The Henri IV had 1 man killed and 9 wounded; The Sané has 3 men killed and 9 wounded

— Louis Dubourdieu,

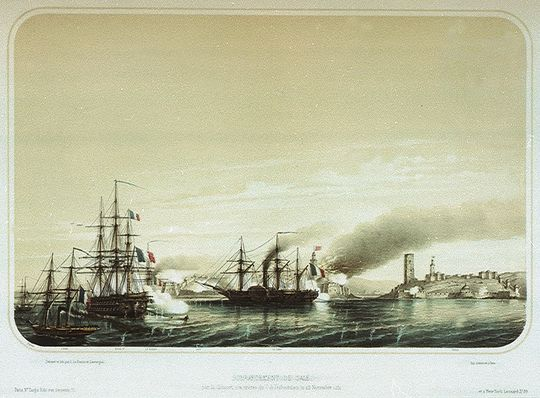
The bombardment of the city by the French fleet, painting by Louis Le Breton

The damage to Salé was considerable; a wall from the Almohad Caliphate was severely damaged, and the Great Mosque of Salé was struck by six cannonballs. Several homes were destroyed, and many were burnt down. Between 12 and 15 civilians were killed, along with six to seven soldiers. Tactically, the battle was a victory for France. In order to prevent Tangier from receiving a similar bombardment, Morocco agreed to pay 100,000 francs to the French on 29 November 1851.

Politically, however, the battle is considered a failure for France. Initially, France had desired a revolt against the governor of Salé to force repayment and avoid destruction of the city, but this did not occur. The French demanded that those who killed Christians in the city be sentenced to death, and that thieves have their hands cut off; however, the governor of Salé simply banished these people from the city.

A few months later, the Governor Abdelhadi Zniber described the situation to sultan Abd al-Rahman through his grand vizier:

God gave the people of Islam firm legs that still stand upright and made their religion manifest in spite of the polytheists. Little harm has been done to us, thank goodness. [...] We have seen with our own eyes the benevolence of God and the unimaginable beauty of his creation. When God drove the infidels away, there was nothing they could accomplish. God gave victory to the believers and kept them safe from the deception of the enemy.

— Abdelhadi Zniber,

Following this confrontation, diplomatic relations between France and Morocco ended for several months, until a French diplomatic mission returned in 1852. After the bombardment, Dubourdieu was promoted to Grand Officer of the Legion of Honor, and then to vice-admiral in February 1852.

Sultan Abd al-Rahman died on 28 August 1859. France took the opportunity to launch an expedition in eastern Morocco between August and December 1859, by occupying Oujda, without a fight, and by facing the Beni Snassen. The French expeditionary force consisted of 18,000 soldiers, reinforced by several thousand more, was commanded by General de Martimprey. The spread of cholera in the French army killed several thousand in its ranks and put an end to the expedition, at the same time Muhammad IV succeeded his father.
