= Moroccan War =

Moroccan War may refer to:

- Franco-Moroccan War of 1844, between France and Morocco
- Hispano-Moroccan War (1859–1860), between Spain and Morocco
- Rif War also known as the Second Moroccan War, 1921–1926, between Spain, France and Northern Morocco (Republic of the Rif)

== Others ==
- List of Spanish colonial wars in Morocco
- Sand War, 1963, between Algeria and Morocco
- Western Sahara War, 1975–1991, between Morocco and the indigenous Sahrawi Polisario Front

== See also ==
- Franco-Moroccan War (disambiguation)
- Moroccan–Portuguese conflicts
- Military history of Morocco
- Western Sahara conflict
