= Jeanne Lanternier =

Slave concubine

Jeanne Lanternier (born November 20, 1820, in Chatley, France – 1855, Marrakesh) was a slave concubine and then one of the wives of Sultan Muhammad IV of Morocco (r. 1859–1873).

== Biography ==
Originally from Val-d'Amour, her parents were Sophie and Jean Lanternier, her father was a hemp carder. In 1832, at the age of 12, she emigrated with her parents to Algeria, the Lanternier family was among the pioneers who settled in the first village created by France, Dély Ibrahim.

Four years later, returning from the fields, Jeanne accompanied by her parents and her brother Déziré were captured by Hadjoutes marauders, who handed the family over as hostages to Emir Abdelkader. He offered the teenage girl as a slave to his friend the sultan of Morocco Abd al-Rahman bin Hisham. He in turn offered her to his son Muhammad bin Abd al-Rahman. She was converted to Islam under the name Dagia and entered the 'Alawi harem as the slave concubine of Prince Muhammed. The following year, in 1837, Muhammed chose to manumit and marry her.

Shortly after the defeat of Sidi Muhammad by Marshal Bugeaud, during the Battle of Isly on 14 August 1844, Jeanne gave birth to a son. Muhammad bin Abd al-Rahman allowed her to make contact with her family. She was permitted to visit France on the occasion on Exposition Universelle (1855). She used the visit to make contact with her birth village in France, and also performed a pilgrimage to Chissey.

Upon her return to Morocco the same year, however, a conflict occurred in the harem, which resulted in the death of her and her two sons by use of poison.
