= Abd al-Rahman of Morocco =

Sultan of Morocco from 1822 to 1859

'Abd al-Rahman bin Hisham عبد الرحمن بن هشام
- Amir al-Mu'minin
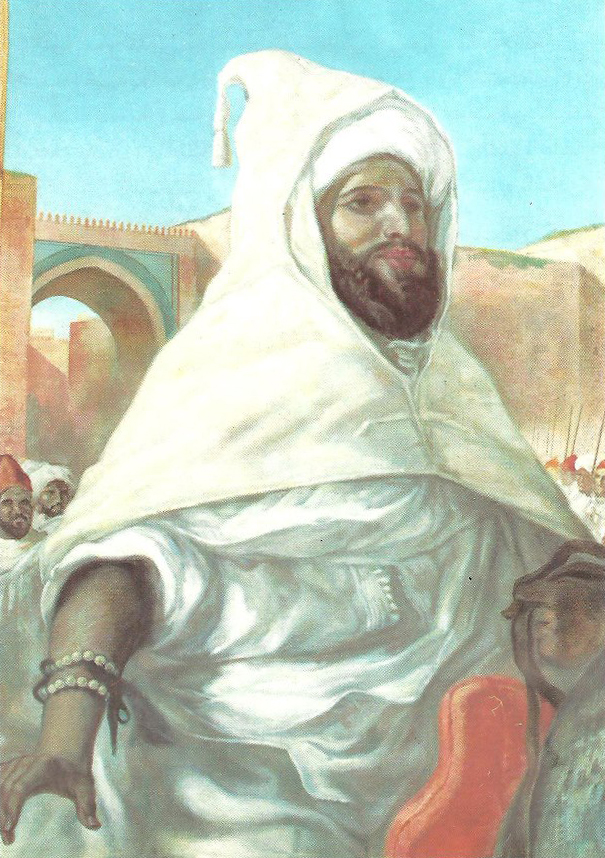
- The Sultan of Morocco; Moulay 'Abd al-Rahman in 1845

Sultan of Morocco
- Reign: 1822–1859
- Predecessor: Moulay Sulayman
- Successor: Moulay Muhammad IV
- Born: February 19, 1778; Fes, Morocco
- Died: August 28, 1859 (aged 81); Meknes, Morocco
- Burial: Mausoleum of Moulay Ismail, Meknes, Morocco
- Spouse: among others: Lalla Mubaraka el-Chawiya; Lalla Halima bint Sulayman; Lalla Fatima Zahra bint Sulayman; Lalla Safiya al-Alja
- Issue: 54 children, including: Moulay Muhammad IV; Lalla Maryam
- Dynasty: 'Alawi
- Father: Moulay Hisham bin Muhammad
- Religion: Maliki Sunni Islam

Moulay Abd al-Rahman bin Hisham (Arabic: عبد الرحمن بن هشام; 19 February 1778 – 28 August 1859) was Sultan of Morocco from 30 November 1822 to 28 August 1859, as a ruler of the 'Alawi dynasty. He was a son of Moulay Hisham. He was proclaimed sultan in Fes after the death of Moulay Sulayman.

During his long reign he proved himself competent in an age where Africa was being colonized by stronger European nations, such as neighbouring Ottoman Algeria which was invaded by France. He was able to preserve Moroccan independence and maintain Moroccan borders without ceding any land, while also supporting Emir Abd al-Qadir's resistance in Algeria against France. He also signed the necessary treaties to enforce his beliefs, and fought numerous conflicts with European nations, especially France.

== Early life and rise ==
Abd al-Rahman bin Hisham was born in Fes on 19 February 1778 to Hisham bin Mohammed and his wife a lady belonging to the Jirari family. Following the death of his uncle Sulayman, Abd al-Rahman was proclaimed sultan of Morocco in Fes on 30 November 1822. His reign began during a tumultuous time, when many noble families and rural tribal confederations in Morocco were trying to extract greater power away from the center, and spent much of the early part of his reign crushing revolts.

Moulay Sulayman entrusted the throne to Abd al-Rahman in a testamentary letter which was immediately sent to Fes:

I do not think that the children of Mawlana, the grandfather Abdallah, nor the children of Moulay, my father, may God have mercy on him, nor the children of his children, are better than my master Abd al-Rahman ibn Hisham, and I am not better for this matter than him, because - God willing – may God protect him, he does not drink alcohol, does not commit adultery, does not lie, and does not betray. He does not take blood and money unnecessarily. And if the king of the two Easts reigns... and he fasts the obligatory and the supererogatory, and he prays the obligatory and the supererogatory. But I brought him from Essaouira for people to see and know him. And I took it out of Tafilalet to show it to them, because religion is advice. If the people of truth follow him, their affairs will be made right, as did Moulay Muhammad, his grandfather, and his father is alive. They never need me, and the people of Morocco will envy him and follow him, God willing. And whoever followed him followed guidance and light. And whoever follows others, he follows sedition and misguidance.

— Moulay Sulayman,

Abd al-Rahman was tall and tanned, he was firm in his stance despite his advanced age, and wore simple clothes. Every day, he rode a horse to his garden in Agdal, situated near the gates of Fes. Abd al-Rahman was an unusual choice for Sulayman over his own sons indicating he believed that Abd al-Rahman had the personal qualities needed to be a Sultan. Abd al-Rahman showed military skill during Sulayman's campaign against Moulay Ibrahim and administrative skills as governor of Essaouira and then Fes. This allowed him to fit in the paradigm of the "mujāhid-sultan". Being the son of Hisham who was sultan in the south between 1792 and 1799 as well as the protege of Sulayman made him acceptable to both the south and the north and he had adopted a conciliatory approach to the rebel faction and Idrisid shurafa in Fes making his acceptance as Sultan by the army and notables of Fes more likely. Despite this, he had to face a number of pretenders including the brother of Sulayman, Moulay Musa in Marrakesh, and his two sons, Moulay Abd al-Wahid in Tafilalt and Moulay Abd al-Rahman in Meknes.

== Reign ==
=== Early reign ===
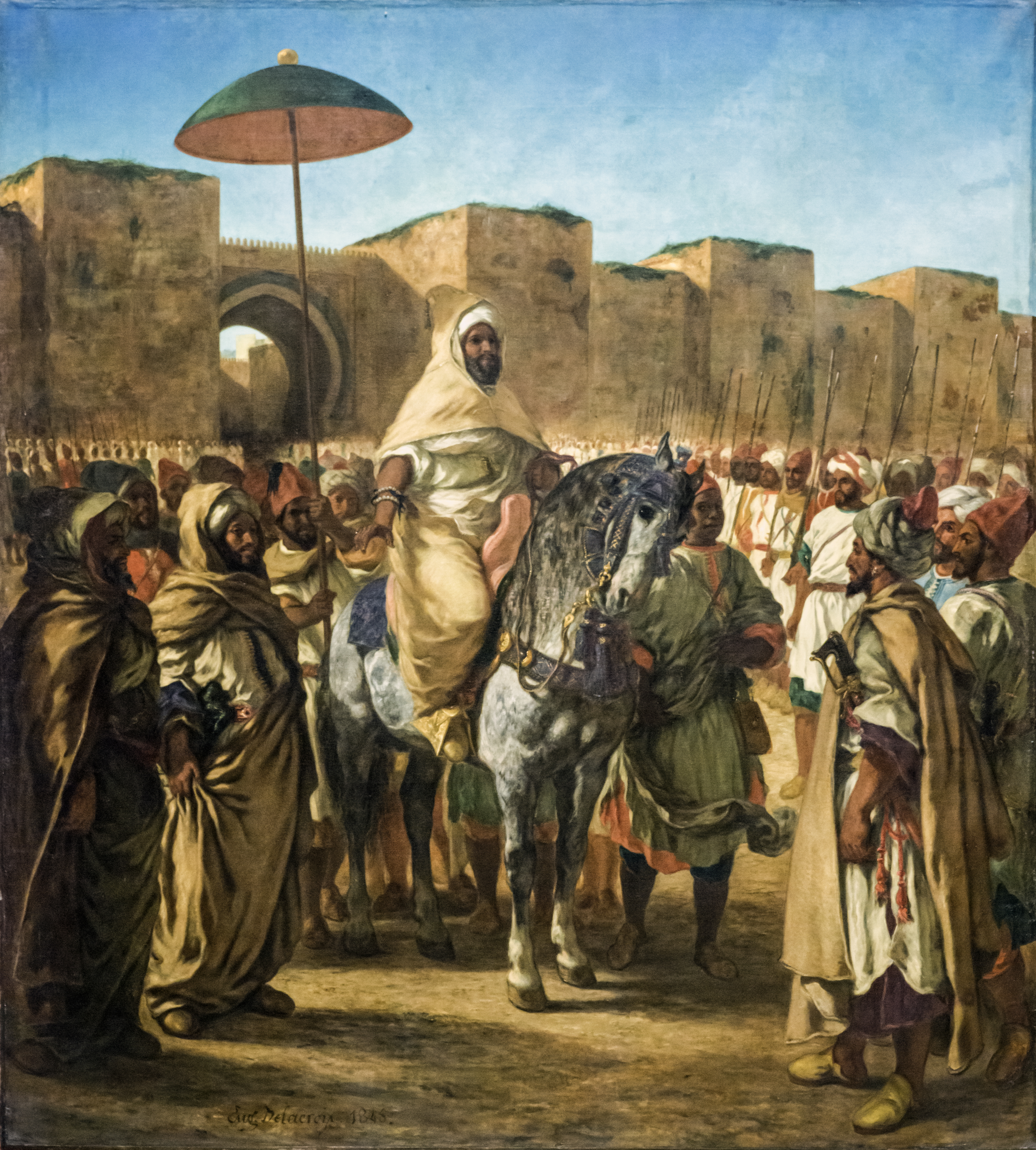
Sultan Moulay Abd al-Rahman of Morocco and his courtiers

Upon ascension, the sultan's finances were in shambles. With the country in disarray, the central government (the Makhzen) was unable to collect much customary taxation. Abd al-Rahman turned to foreign trade, which had been cut off by the prior sultan, as a way to reap in customs revenue, and began to negotiate a series of trade treaties with various European powers.

Moulay Abd al-Rahman was an enthusiastic advocate of foreign trade. As governor of Essaouira he had encouraged European merchants, and after he became sultan, consul after consul trekked down to Marrakesh; the Portuguese in 1823, the British in 1824, the French and the Sardinian in 1825. Each signed a trade treaty, although Morocco had little to export because in 1825 the country began another cycle of poor rainfall and famine.

To recoup his expenses Moulay Abd al-Rahman decided to revive the institution of Barbary piracy and reestablish his corsairing fleet. In 1828 it captured some British ships and an Austrian one. This created confrontations with the British as they blockaded Tangier, and the Austrians bombarded Larache, Asilah and Tetouan in 1829. The final bombardment of a Moroccan city in retribution for piracy occurred in 1851 at Salé.

He was an adept leader and administrator and was able to build public works and infrastructure. He did however have to deal with internal conflicts and had to quell revolts many times: 1824–1825, 1828, 1831–1832, 1843, 1849, 1852, 1853, and 1857–1858. He was always successful at placating the nobles and malcontents though.

=== Expedition of Austria (1829–1830) ===
The navy of the Austrian Empire retaliated with force for the capture of their ship, the Veloce, by the Moroccan corsairing fleet. The Austrians resolved to blockading the Moroccan ports, and then opened hostilities and bombarded Larache, Asilah and Tétouan. In June 1829 they landed at Larache and burned Moroccan ships. The Austrian landing at Larache frightened the Moroccan people on a general attack on the Muslims of North Africa, following when war started between the French and the Ottoman province of Algiers in 1827. However, the landing was a complete failure. In 1830, Austria concluded a treaty in which the principal condition was to offer a splendid gift to the sultan.

=== Invasion of Algiers (1830) ===
The most serious foreign threat to Morocco, however, was France, which had launched its invasion of neighboring Ottoman Algeria in 1830. The French landing at Sidi Feruj near Algiers and subsequent French victory in the Battle of Staouéli caused panic in Morocco, while Moroccans expressed solidarity with the Algerians. In the years preceding the French landing, in order to replace revenue lost through the demise of piracy, the Deys (the Ottoman-appointed heads of the Regency of Algiers) had raised taxes, turning the native population against them. The problem of mixed loyalties became even more acute after the French landing. As French forces pushed deeper into the interior, the tribes and city dwellers of the Province of Oran turned to Morocco for help. In the summer of 1830, Abd al-Rahman accepted boatloads of Algerian refugees arriving in the ports of Tangier and Tétouan, ordering his governors to find them housing and settle them into work.

=== Intervention in Tlemcen (1830–1832) ===
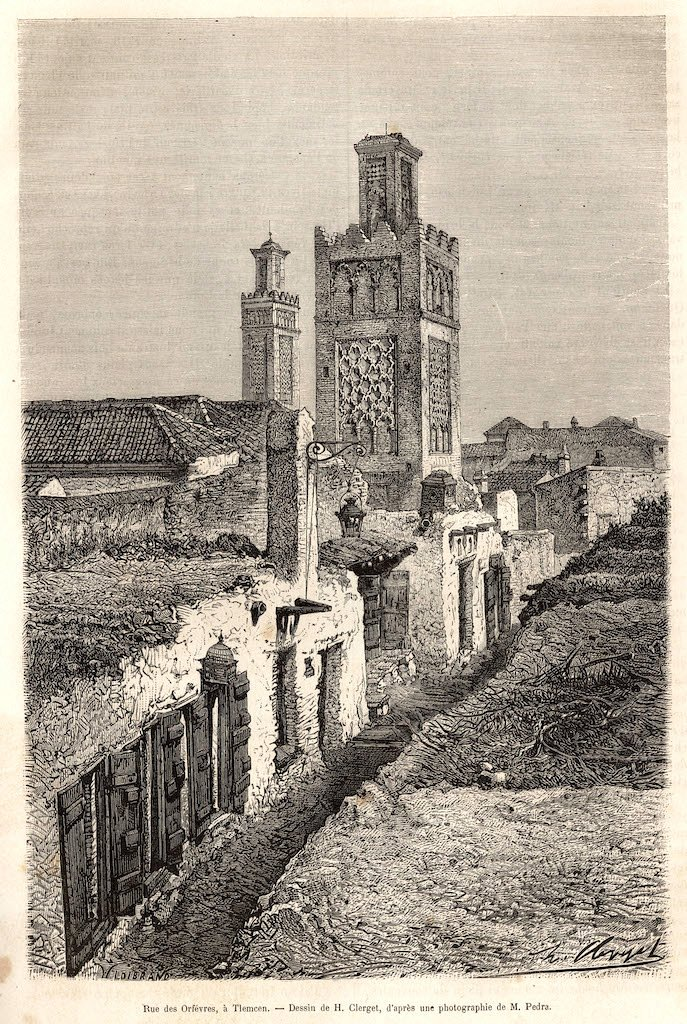
Tlemcen (1875)

Shortly after Algiers fell in 1830, and fearing French invaders, Muhammad Bennouna organised a deputation to ask Moulay Abd al-Rahman to accept a bay'a from Tlemcen. The people of Tlemcen offered Abd al-Rahman the oath of allegiance that would legally establish 'Alawi rule over their region. The Sultan consulted the 'ulama of Fez, who ruled that the inhabitants of Tlemcen had already sworn allegiance to the Ottoman Sultan and they could not change it now. In September 1830 the Tlemcenis sent another letter arguing that the authority of the Sublime Porte no longer existed, and that its former representatives had been irreligious tyrants. The notables of the beleaguered city kept pressuring for a Moroccan intervention, reminding Abd al-Rahman that the defense of Islam was the duty of the just ruler.

In October 1830 the sultan named his nephew Moulay Ali ben Slimane, who was only fifteen years old, as Khalifa of Tlemcen and sent him to take control of Tlemcen. An uncle of the sultan, Idris al-Jarari, the Governor of Oujda, was sent with him to help in protecting the city. The Moroccan troops were warmly welcomed, even in the provinces of Titteri and Constantine. The Moroccan Sultan's authority was speedily recognised in all parts of the regency. The khotba, or public prayer, was pronounced in all the mosques for the Sultan of Morocco. Everything conspired to confirm the belief that Algeria had peaceably passed under the Moorish sceptre.

Moulay Ali let local rivalries continue unchecked, while his troops pillaged the countryside instead of taking the citadel of Tlemcen, still manned by Ottoman troops. In March 1831 the sultan recalled both of them and nominated the Governor of Tétouan Ibn al-Hami in their place. The Moroccan intervention in Algeria made it clear that the 'Alawi leadership could not orchestrate the popular feelings against the French to their own advantage. In January 1832 France sent an ambassador to Sultan Abd al-Rahman, demanding that he withdraw Morocco’s presence from Tlemcen. The Sultan initially refused to evacuate the city, but when a French warship appeared at Tangier the Makhzen negotiated and the sultan agreed to withdraw his troops. The Moroccan troops evacuated Tlemcen in May. But before Ibn al-Hami left, he appointed a new governor in the sultan's name. This was the local head of the Qadiriyya tariqa, Muhyi al-Din, who began to organise resistance to the French. In November he handed the leadership to his son, Abd al-Kader. Another embassy was sent by the Marabouts and chiefs to Fez to implore the Moroccan Sultan to provide aid and assistance. Abd al-Rahman complied with their request, by sending a confidential agent to Mascara. This proceeding, however, produced no effect.

=== Wadaya Revolt (1831–1834) ===
As a result of the sultan's withdrawal from Tlemcen in March 1831, the Wadaya rebelled in the countryside of Morocco and recognised a relative of the sultan, Mohammed bin al-Tayyib, as sultan. The revolt began in the north and spread throughout Morocco, including the capital Fes, the sultan decided to leave Fes for Meknes which was safer and was protected by the 'Abid al-Bukhari infantry, but on the way to Meknes he was stopped by rebel troops who sent him back to Fes. After the sultan learned about the unpopularity of the chief minister, he dismissed him, took away his wealth, and gave it to the Wadaya as a generous bribe, but this did not stop the rebellion. A few months later, the sultan managed to escape Fes and settle in Meknes, where he slowly built the army there by recruiting more troops. With this army, he marched on Fes and besieged it for 40 days before the Wadaya surrendered in 1834. The sultan ordered the execution of the two most important leaders of the Wadaya revolt, and dispersed them from Fes to Marrakesh, Larache, and Rabat, ending their rebellion.

=== Support for Emir Abd al-Qadir (1832–1844) ===
Abd al-Rahman supported the continued guerrilla resistance in Algeria led by Abd al-Qadir al-Jaza'iri who was in theory, a vassal of the Moroccan sultan, albeit only tentatively, not wishing to incur French retaliation. But the border tribes of Morocco continued supporting Abd al-Qadir more actively, prompting the French launch their own strikes over the border and establishing forward outposts in Moroccan territory, which only inflamed the reaction in Morocco and increased the irregular border war. The Moroccan army attacked a French military group which France considered a declaration of war. After learning that the Sultan had sent huge forces to the eastern front, Peugeot gave Morocco a deadline of eight days to withdraw its armies from the east, but the Sultan was not convinced.

=== Franco-Moroccan War (1844), and aftermath ===
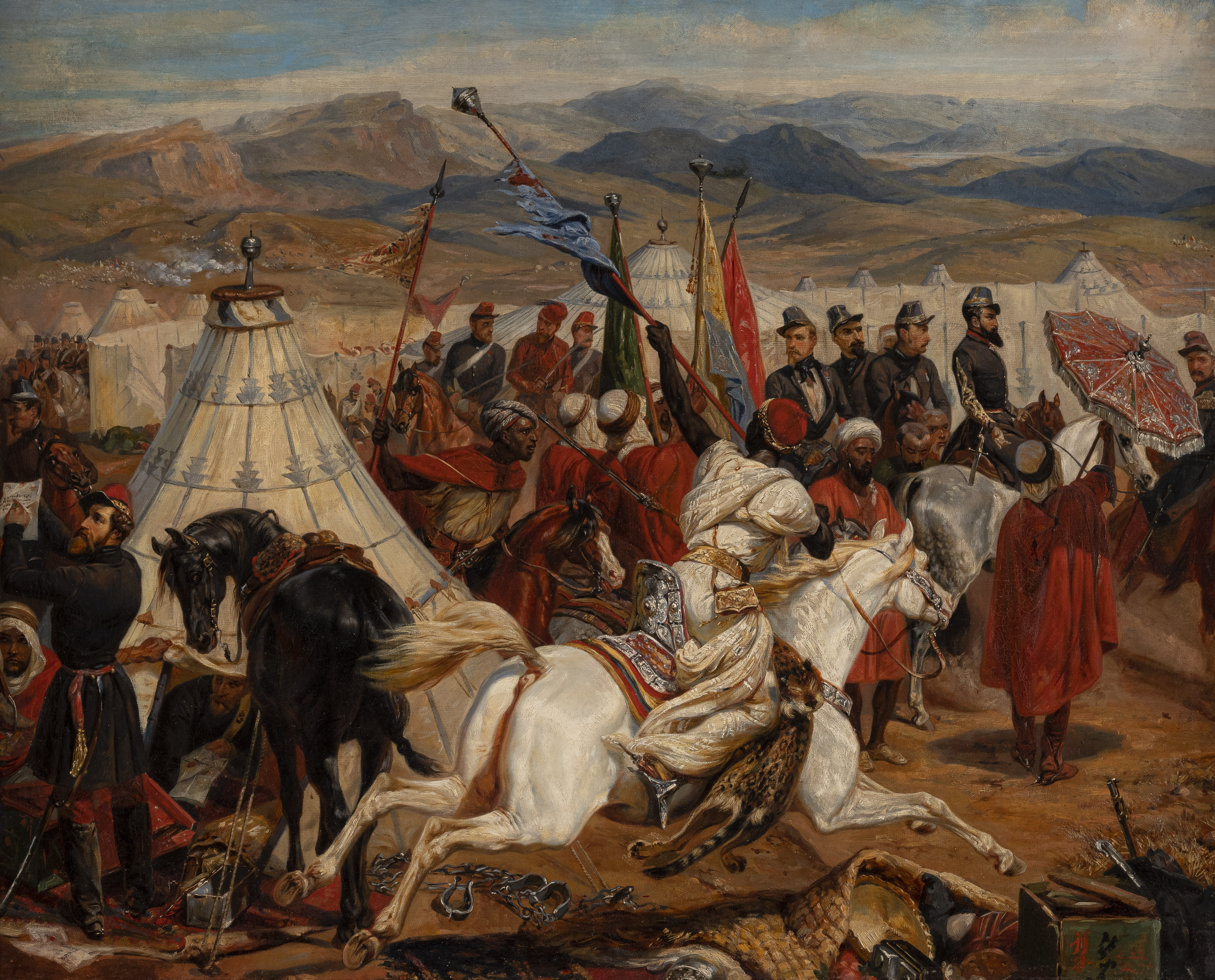
Battle of Isly (1844)

The French then demanded that Morocco cease its support of Abd al-Qadir and cede its eastern frontier lands to French control and, in 1844, launched the First Franco-Moroccan War. The war did not go well for the sultan. The French navy bombarded Mogador (Essaouira) and Tangier, while the Moroccan army, under Abd al-Rahman's son Moulay Muhammad, was defeated by the French at the Battle of Isly in August 1844. Abd al-Rahman consented to the Treaty of Tangier in October 1844, withdrawing support for al-Qadir, and reducing border garrisons.

The treaties aggravated the internal situation in Morocco. Abd al-Rahman in fact rejected the Treaty of Lalla Maghnia at first, blaming it on his negotiators, but was eventually forced to ratify it. Army units and rural tribes across the north and east, already basically ungovernable, started raising rebellions which were only crushed with difficulty. The aftermath saw the break between Abd al-Rahman and Abd al-Qadir.

The crushing defeat at Isly and the bombardment of the Moroccan ports by the squadron commanded by the Prince de Joinville had grave consequences both for the sultan's internal authority and for his relations with Europe. The defeat of Isly sparked off tribal rebellions in many parts of Morocco. The Dukkala tribesmen in the region between Safi and El Jadida massacred government officials and looted El Jadida. Essaouira was pillaged by the tribes when its inhabitants deserted it. Rebellious tribes threatened Marrakesh, and in September 1845 Rabat rebelled and its leaders chose a local notable to replace the governor appointed by the sultan. The sultan's international standing was also weakened as a result of this defeat. The Scandinavian countries immediately ceased to make him the customary annual gift to retain commercial relations with Morocco. And the sultan, aware that much harm to the country could be avoided through speedy communications with the European consuls, appointed in 1845 a na'ib (deputy) to conduct relations with them on behalf of the sultan. Though the na'ib resided in, and often held the post of governor of, Tangier, he became in fact if not in title a minister of foreign affairs.

After the defeat of Isly, Moroccan tolerance for Abd el-Qadir's use of Morocco to launch raids upon French controlled Algeria waned. Faced with this worsening his relations with the French and the popularity of Abd al-Qadir among his subjects the Sultan would force Abd el-Qadir out.

This prompted the eventual surrender of Abd el-Qadir to the French on the 20th of December 1847.

=== Bombardment of Salé (1851) ===
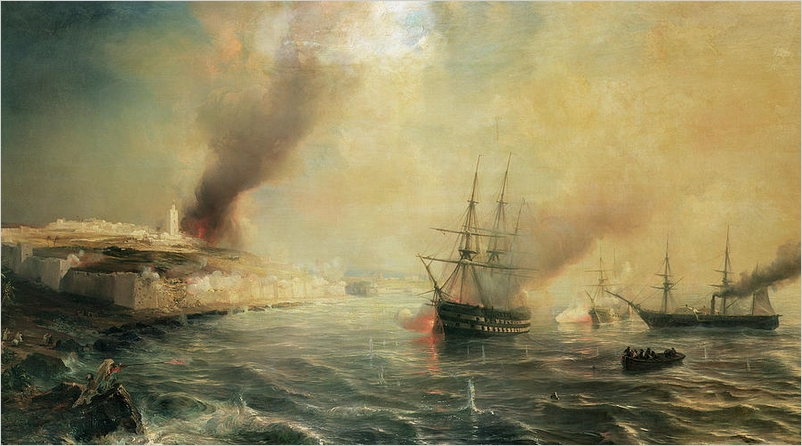
Bombardment of Salé (1851)

On 25 November 1851, French ships anchored off Rabat and Salé. Moroccan soldiers in those cities prepared to repel the French attack and armed themselves with artillery. At 10:00 a.m, the French fleet opened fire on the forts of Salé, while the Moroccans retaliated instantly with forty batteries of artillery weapons. An hour later, the batteries in Salé were destroyed, while the artillery in Rabat were damaged to the point where they became almost useless, however Moroccan reinforcements arrived. The damaged batteries were removed from the cities by Moroccan forces who continued to resist. By the end of the bombardment, the Moroccans had 18 to 22 men killed and 47 of them wounded, with many fortifications damaged. On the other hand, the French had losses of 4 killed and 18 wounded, as well as two of their battleships damaged. Both sides claimed victory, as the bombardment ended in a French military victory but also in a Moroccan political victory.

=== Anglo-Moroccan Treaty (1856) ===
In 1856, Britain persuaded the sultan to sign a treaty in Tangier on 9 December 1856, after long negotiations between John Hay Drummond Hay, a representative of Queen Victoria, and Muhammad al-Khatib, a representative of the sultan Abd al-Rahman. Moroccan trade was freed from almost all its monopolies, custom duties were reduced to ten percent of value, Morocco's door was opened to a larger volume of overseas trade, and British subjects could own property in Morocco.

=== Construction projects ===
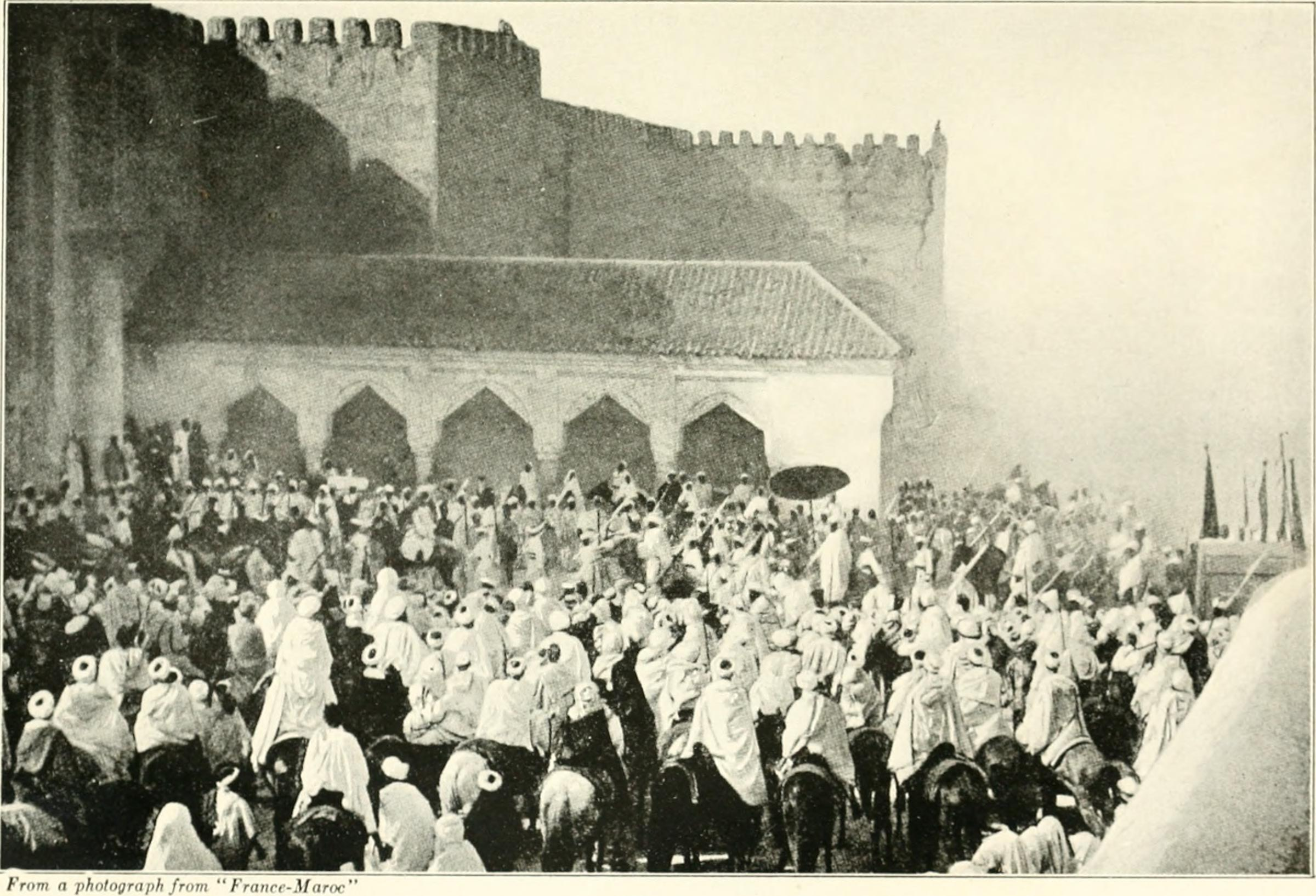
Royal ceremony taking place in front of Bab Mansour in 1920, with Moulay Abd al-Rahman's 19th-century loggia visible in the back.

In 1856, Moulay Abd al-Rahman established the souk of Zraqten on the north side of the High Atlas, adding to territory in southern Morocco controlled by the Glaouis, who were Caids ruling various southern areas from the 18th century until Moroccan independence in 1956, after originally settling in Telouet to establish a souk. They would tax caravans travelling from the Sahara and Tafilalt regions as well as taxing goods sold locally.

The Agdal Gardens of Marrakesh, an irrigated garden, originally established by the Almoravids in the 12th century and enlarged in the days of the Saadians was revamped, reforested and encircled by ramparts during the reign of Moulay Abd al-Rahman.

== Armed Forces ==
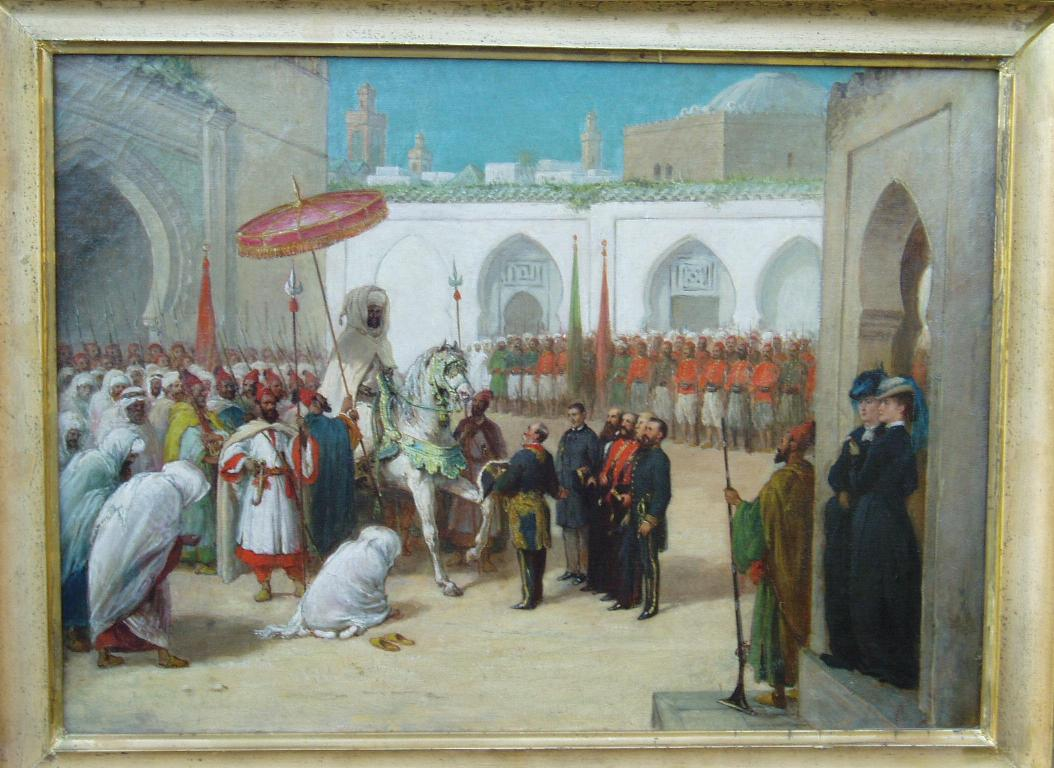
Moulay Abd al-Rahman's son and successor, Sidi Muhammad IV (1868).

When Moulay Abd al-Rahman bin Hicham ascended the throne on 30 November 1822, Morocco was an undefeated power with a modern army made up of four main armed forces:

- The Guich military tribes or Makhzen tribes which provided the regular contingents.
- The Black Guard or the Abid al-Bukhari who were of Sub-Saharan origin.
- The contingents provided by tribes who paid taxes or provided some contingents of recruits.
- The Holy warriors or the Mujahideen who provided massive levies in case of extreme danger.

== Death ==
Abd al-Rahman died in Meknes on August 28, 1859, and was buried in the Mausoleum of Moulay Ismail. He was succeeded by his son Muhammad, who took the title of sultan Muhammad IV. Immediately upon Sidi Muhammad's ascension to throne in August 1859, Spain declared war on Morocco, culminating into the Hispano-Moroccan War in which Spain sent troops to Ceuta in order to capture Tetuan.

== See also ==
- List of sultans of Morocco
- History of Morocco
- 'Alawi dynasty
- Emir Abdelkader
- Battle of Isly

== Biography ==
=== Books ===
- Abun-Nasr, Jamil M. (1987). A History of the Maghrib in the Islamic Period. Cambridge University Press. ISBN 9780521337670.
- Caillé, Jacques (1957). Une ambassade autrichienne au Maroc en 1805: documents inédits avec introd. et commentaire (in French). Larose.
- Churchill, Charles Henry (1867). The Life of Abdel Kader, Ex-sultan of the Arabs of Algeria: Written from His Own Dictation, and Comp. from Other Authentic Sources. Chapman and Hall.
- Miller, Susan (2013). A History of Modern Morocco. Cambridge University Press. ISBN 978-0-521-81070-8.
- Paillet (1844). Revue de Bruxelles (in French). Dewageneer.
- Pennell, C. R. (2000). Morocco Since 1830: A History. C. Hurst & Co. Publishers. ISBN 9781850654261.
- Bennison, Amira K (2002). Jihad and its interpretations in pre-colonial Morocco: state-society relations during the French conquest of Algeria. Taylor & Francis. ISBN 9781135788148.

=== Websites ===
- Hekking, Morgan (2020). "The Battle of Isly: Remembering Morocco's Solidarity With Algeria". Morocco World News.

| Preceded by Sulayman | Sultan of Morocco; 1822–1859 | Succeeded by Muhammad IV |
