= Franco-Moroccan War (disambiguation) =

Franco-Moroccan Wars include:

- Larache Expedition (1765)
- French conquest of Algeria (1830–44)
- Franco-Moroccan War (1844)
- Bombardment of Salé (1851)
- South-Oranese Campaign (1897–1903)
- French conquest of Morocco (1907–34)
- Zaian War (1914–21)
- Rif War (1921–26)
- Ifni War (1957–58)
