= Treaty of Tangier (1844) =

1844 treaty between Morocco and France

- Type: Peace treaty
- Signed: 10 September 1844 (26 Sha'ban 1260)
- Location: Tanger, Morocco
- Parties: France; Morocco
- Ratifiers: (France) Louis Philippe I; (Morocco) Abd al-Rahman
- Languages: French; Arabic

The Treaty of Tangier (French: Traité de Tanger, Arabic: معاهدة طنجة) was signed in Tangier on 10 September 1844, whereby the Franco-Moroccan War was ended and Morocco officially recognised Algeria as a French possession.

== History ==
The Sultan Abd al-Rahman's support for Emir Abd al-Qadir led to the French bombarding Tangier on 6 August. On 14 August, Moroccan troops were attacked by general Thomas Robert Bugeaud in the battle of Isly at Wadi Isly, not far from the French Algerian border. The day following the battle, French Navy forces bombarded and occupied Mogador.

A month later, the Treaty of Tangier was signed on 10 September 1844, ending the war, in which Morocco recognised Algeria as a French possession.

== See also ==
- List of treaties
