= Franco-Moroccan War =

1844 war between France and Morocco

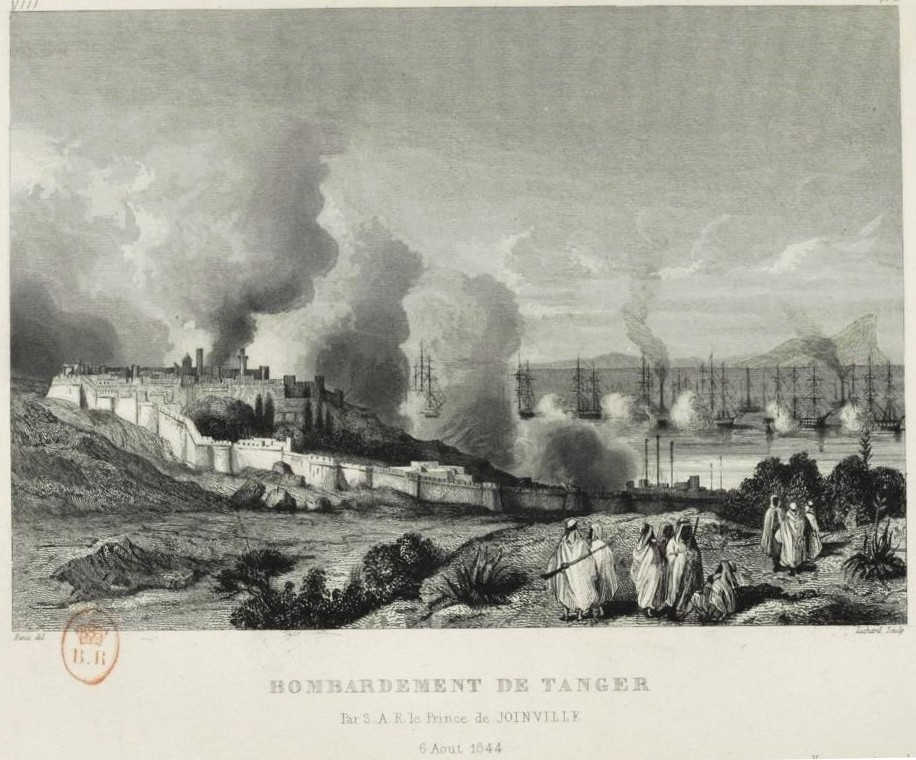
- Painting of the Bombardment of Tangier.
Date	6 August – 10 September 1844 (1 month, 4 days)
Location	Morocco
Result	French victory: Treaty of Tangier
Territorial changes	Treaty of Lalla Maghnia

Belligerents
France; (France) French Algeria	Morocco

Commanders and leaders
(France) François d'Orléans (France) Thomas Bugeaud	(Morocco) Abd al-Rahman (Morocco) Mohammed IV

Strength
15,000 troops 15 warships	40,000 cavalry 300 artillery

Casualties and losses
Total: 224; 44 killed 180 wounded	Total: 3,221; 1,150 killed 1,900 wounded 160 captured 11 cannons lost

The Franco-Moroccan War (Arabic: الحرب الفرنسية المغربية, French: Guerre franco-marocaine) was fought between the Kingdom of France and the Sultanate of Morocco from 6 August to 10 September 1844. The principal cause of war was the retreat of Algerian resistance leader Abd al-Kader into Morocco following French victories over many of his tribal supporters during the French conquest of Algeria and the refusal of the Sultan of Morocco Moulay Abd al-Rahman to abandon the cause of Abd al-Kader against colonial occupation.

== Background ==
Shortly after the French invasion of Algiers in 1830, the Emir Abdelkader arose as the leader of the resistance. He called on Moroccan tribesmen of the eastern, mainly the great confederation of Beni Znassen, to join his resistance, and he entreated the sultan to help him with military supplies. Abd al-Rahman complied by maintaining a steady stream of horses, arms, and money flowing to him.

In October 1842, after another defeat, Abd al-Kader fled with his followers from the territory of their fathers to Morocco. Abd al-Kader had for some time made the Morocco frontier the basis of his forays into Algeria. He could retire within the Moroccan territory without molestation. The French, in order not to be thus baffled, had at last advanced a strong division to that part of the frontier from whence he made his sallies. Generals Louis Juchault de Lamoricière and Marie Alphonse Bedeau fixed on their encampment on Lalla Maghnia. On 22 May 1844, El-Gennaoui, commander of the Moorish garrison at Oujda, summoned the French to evacuate Lalla Maghnia. On the 30th, the Moorish Qaid, unable to control the fanatic passions of the contingents assembled around him, gave way to fire into the French entrenchments. Lamoricière and Bedeau quickly defeated and dispersed them, with the Moorish troops falling back upon Oujda. On 15 June, the Moorish troops approached unnoticed, and fired upon the French troops, wounding Captain Eugène Daumas and two men. The Moorish chief declared that the frontier must be set back to the Tafna River, and in case of refusal it was war. The Governor-General of Algeria and French Marshal Thomas Robert Bugeaud wrote to El-Gennaoui insisting that the border be demarcated along the Kiss River, a position further west than the Tafna River, and threatening of war if Morocco would continue receiving and succouring Abd al-Kader. The Marshal was seconded by one of King Louis Philippe I's sons, the young Admiral François d'Orléans, Prince of Joinville, who was commanding the cruisers off the Moorish coasts.

On 19 June, violating the frontier, Marshal Bugeaud occupied Oujda. The dispute, thus commenced on the frontier, soon spread into the higher regions of diplomacy. The French Government sent a squadron under Prince de Joinville to the coast of Morocco to support its official reclamations. Marshal Bugeaud received instructions to commence offensive operations by land. Abd al-Rahman sent orders to all his provincial Governors for a general levy. Abd al-Kader made his way into Djebel Amour, and endeavoured to raise the southern tribes against the French. They all remained faithful; the Emir only obtained a promise that they would join the Moorish army when it met the infidel forces.

On 1 July, the Moors made an attack on the banks of Isly but fled at the first musket-shots. The French troops ascended the river on the 11th, and on the 13th killed some hundred horsemen of the Moorish tribes, losing only two men and five horses. On the 19th the French troops returned to Lalla Maghnia for refreshment. The Prince de Joinville, cruising in the waters of Cádiz with a flying squadron, received orders to proceed to Tangier. The French Consul in Spain forwarded to the court of Fez Marshal Bugeaud's ultimatum to the Qaid Si el-Gennaoui.

== War ==
=== Bombardment of Tangier ===
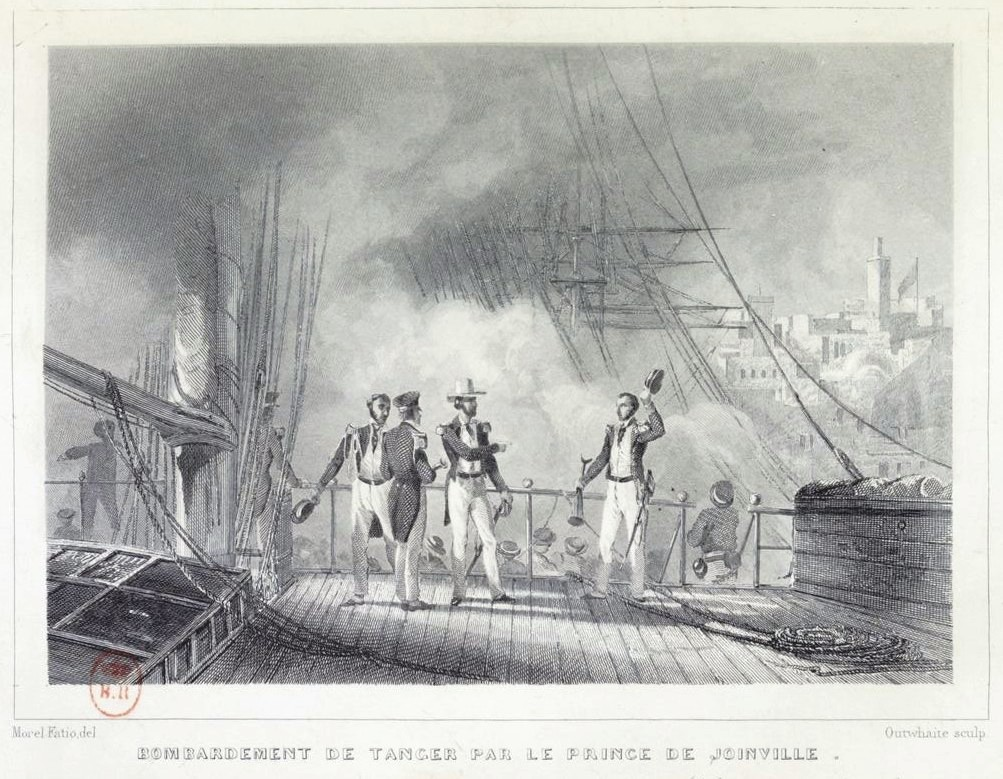
Painting of Prince of Joinville bombarding Tangier.

The war began on August 6, 1844, at eight in the morning, when a French fleet under the command of the Prince of Joinville François d'Orléans, in his first action as a squadron commander, conducted a naval Bombardment of Tangier. In an hour's time all the outer batteries were destroyed; two works held out longer, the battery of the Kasbah and that of the marine fort. At eleven the fire ceased, the Prince commanding the squadron had executed the order of the Ministry, the exterior fortifications were in ruins, the town had been respected. The squadron, then, went into the Atlantic, passed along the coast of Morocco, and, though the weather was very bad, anchored before Mogador on 11 August. The condition of the sea would not allow of the vessels at once taking up their fighting positions. For three days they had to lie at anchor without being able to communicate.

=== Battle of Isly ===
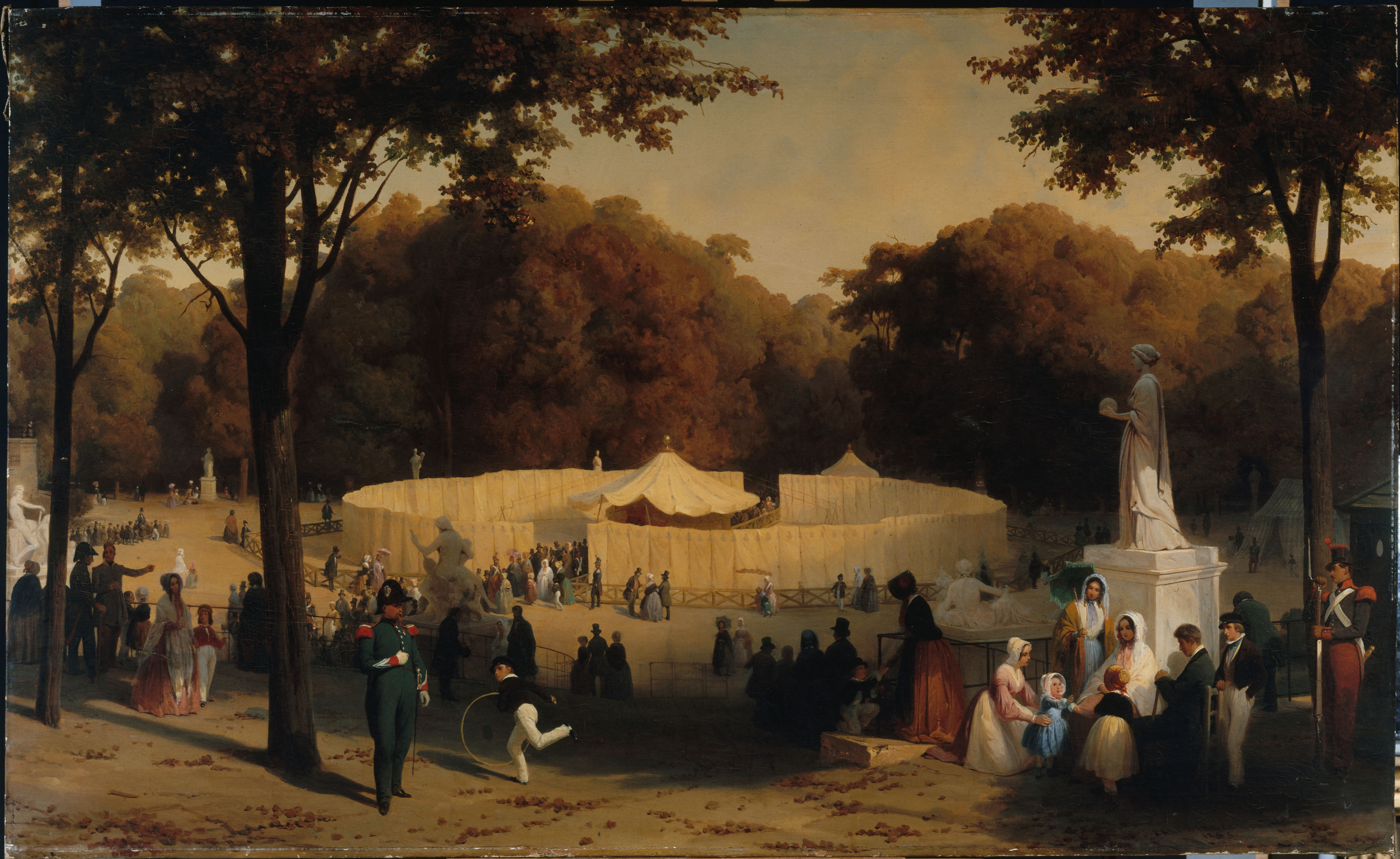
Exposition of Moulay Mohammed's tent in the Tuileries Garden.

The Emperor Abd al-Rahman's son and heir presumptive, Sidi Mohammed, advanced towards Algeria, contrary to the orders of his father, with the intention of turning the French out of Lalla Maghnia. He was deceived by the reports of fanatic personages around him, and perhaps influenced by Abd al-Kader's agents, Sidi Mohammed even talked of a plan of conquering the province of Oran. Moulay Mohammed found the number of his soldiers increasing every day. All the Berber and Arab tribes that inhabit the vast territory extending from Fez to Oujda came to take part in the war against the infidels, and many Algerian tribes prayed for the success of the holy enterprise. The conflict peaked on August 14, 1844, at the Battle of Isly, which took place near Oujda. A large Moroccan force led by the Sultan's son Sidi Mohammed, was defeated by a smaller French royal force under the Governor-General of Algeria Thomas Robert Bugeaud. As a consequence of the battle, Sidi Mohammed retreated to Taza and the Marshal spread his emissaries that he would pursue him there. Abd al-Rahman sent orders to his son to stay the Marshal's march, by making proposals of peace to him. For his victory, King Louis Philippe I conferred the title of Duke of Isly upon Marshal Bugeaud.

=== Bombardment of Mogador ===
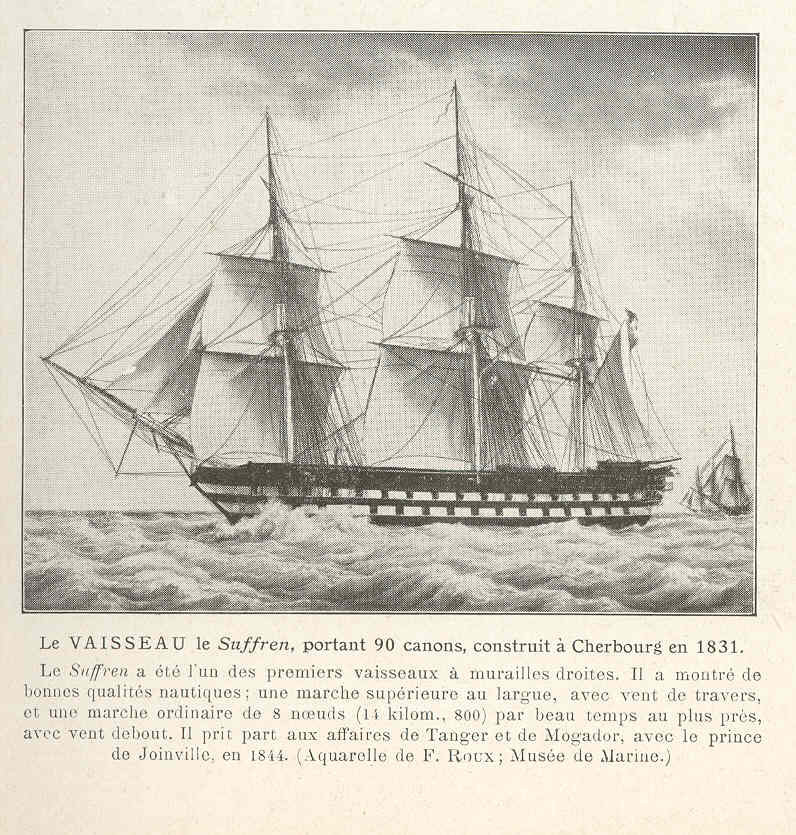
Painting of the Suffren, which took part in the Tangier and Mogador affairs.

The weather cleared up on the 15th. Mogador (Essaouira), Morocco's main Atlantic trade port, was attacked in the Bombardment of Mogador and briefly occupied by Joinville on August 16, 1844. The Suffren, the Jemmapes, and the Triton, opened fire upon the fortifications. The Belle Poule and the other vessels of lighter draught entered the harbour and engaged the batteries of the Marina and those of the island defending the port. At first the Moors made a vigorous reply, but gradually slackened and then ceased their fire, being crushed by the projectiles from the squadron. The batteries fell into ruins, the guns were dismounted, and the gunners driven off. The island alone held out, being defended by a detachment of three hundred and twenty men. The steam-vessels Pluton, Gassendi and Phare, landed five hundred marines, who carried the position under a sharp fire and drive the defenders out of their last entrenchments. Next day a landing party completed the destruction of the works spared by shot. All the guns not dismounted were spiked, the powder drowned, and all the goods found in the custom-house burnt or thrown into the sea.

While steamships played an important part in the operations at Tangier and Mogador, Joinville commanded both bombardments from the ship of the line Suffren, and the three ships of the line in his force provided most of the firepower. The French lost no ships in the shelling, which Joinville called “much more of a political act than an act of warfare”, but suffered a significant casualty afterward, when the paddle steamer Groenland ran aground near Larache on 26 August and could not be saved. The French Government gave a pledge to the United Kingdom that Tangier, as a quasi-European town, would be spared from hostilities. The British had warships on hand at both Tangier and Mogador, and protested the bombardments. The Moroccan campaign, combined with concurrent Anglo-French tensions over Tahiti, fuelled a mild war scare.

== Aftermath ==
=== Treaty of Tangier ===
The war formally ended on September 10, 1844, with the signing of the Treaty of Tangier, in which Morocco agreed to recognize Algeria as part of the French Empire, reduce the size of its garrison at Oujda, and establish a commission to demarcate the border. The peace treaty imposed on the Moroccan monarchy to abandon its support of Abd al-Kader and brand him an “outlaw”. The 4th article of the treaty of peace stipulated that “Hajj Abd al-Kader is placed beyond the pale of the law throughout the entire extent of the Empire of Morocco, as well as in Algeria. He will, consequently, be pursued by main force, by the French on the territory of Algeria, and by the Moroccans on their own territory, till he is expelled therefrom, or falls into the power of one or other nation”. Abd al-Kader would eventually surrender on 24 December 1847 to Henri d'Orléans. The Convention of Tangier also stipulated that the boundaries existing between the Turks and Moors at the moment of the conquest should be preserved, and that the Algero-Moroccan boundary agreement that was to follow was to use as its basis the territorial limits of Algeria as they had existed at the time of the Turkish rule.

=== Treaty of Lalla Maghnia ===
The Treaty of Lalla Maghnia, signed on March 18, 1845, established a topographic border between Algeria and Morocco, but only from the Mediterranean coast to Teniet el-Sassi, some seventy miles inland. The treaty designated that the ksour of Yich and Figuig belong to Morocco, while the ksour of Aïn Séfra, Sfissifa, Asla, Tiout, Chellala, El Bayadh, and Boussemghoun belong to Algeria. The French refused to delineate the frontier to the south of Figuig on the ground that a frontier was superfluous in uninhabited desert land.

== See also ==
- Moroccan expedition (1843-45)
- France–Morocco relations
- French conquest of Algeria
- Bombardment of Salé
- Hispano-Moroccan War
- French conquest of Morocco

== Bibliography ==
=== Books ===
- Abun-Nasr, Jamil M. (1987). A History of the Maghrib in the Islamic Period. Cambridge University Press. ISBN 9780521337670.
- Bouyerdene, Ahmed (2012). Emir Abd El-Kader: Hero and Saint of Islam. World Wisdom, Inc. ISBN 9781936597178.
- Brownlie, Ian (1979). African Boundaries: A Legal and Diplomatic Encyclopaedia. C. Hurst & Co. Publishers. ISBN 9780903983877.
- Churchill, Charles Henry (1867). The Life of Abdel Kader, Ex-sultan of the Arabs of Algeria: Written from His Own Dictation, and Comp. from Other Authentic Sources. Chapman and Hall.
- Clercq, Alexandre J.H. (1865). Recueil des traites de la France, publié sous les auspices du Ministère des affaires étrangères (in French).
- Houtsma, Martijn Theodoor (1987). E.J. Brill's First Encyclopaedia of Islam, 1913-1936. Vol. 9. Brill. ISBN 9004082654.
- Ideville, Henri (1884). Memoirs of marshal Bugeaud, from his private correspondence and original documents, 1784-1849, ed. from the Fr. by C.M. Yonge.
- Miller, Susan Gilson (2013). A History of Modern Morocco. Cambridge University Press. ISBN 9780521810708.
- Paterson, Alexander (1844). The Anglo American. Vol. 3.
- Pennell, C. R. (2000). Morocco Since 1830: A History. C. Hurst & Co. Publishers. ISBN 9781850654261.
- Sondhaus, Lawrence (2004). Navies in Modern World History. Reaktion Books. ISBN 9781861892027.
- Trout, Frank E. (1969). Morocco's Saharan Frontiers. Librairie Droz. ISBN 9782600044950.
- Wagner, Moritz; Pulszky, Ferencz Aurelius (1854). The Tricolor on the Atlas: Or, Algeria and the French Conquest.

=== Websites ===
- Hekking, Morgan (2020). "The Battle of Isly: Remembering Morocco's Solidarity With Algeria". Morocco World News.
