= French ship Triton (1823) =

Ship of the line of the French Navy

- Scale model of Achille, sister ship of French ship Triton (1823), on display at the Musée national de la Marine in Paris.

History

France
- Name: Triton
- Namesake: Triton
- Builder: Rochefort
- Laid down: September 1814
- Launched: 22 September 1823
- Decommissioned: 16 May 1850
- Fate: Hulk until 1870s

General characteristics
- Class & type: Téméraire-class ship of the line
- Displacement: 3,069 tonneaux
- Tons burthen: 1,537 port tonneaux
- Length: 55.87 m (183 ft 4 in)
- Beam: 14.46 m (47 ft 5 in)
- Draught: 7.15 m (23.5 ft)
- Depth of hold: 7.15 m (23 ft 5 in)
- Sail plan: Full-rigged ship
- Crew: 705
- Armament: 74 guns: Lower gun deck: 28 × 36 pdr guns; Upper gun deck: 30 × 18 pdr guns; Forecastle and Quarterdeck: 16–28 × 8 pdr guns and 36 pdr carronades

Triton was a 74-gun Téméraire-class ship of the line built for the French Navy during the 1810s. Completed in 1826, she participated in the Bombardment of Mogador.

== Description ==
Designed by Jacques-Noël Sané, the Téméraire-class ships had a length of 55.87 metres (183 ft 4 in), a beam of 14.46 metres (47 ft 5 in) and a depth of hold of 7.15 metres (23 ft 5 in). The ships displaced 3,069 tonneaux and had a mean draught of 7.15 metres (23 ft 5 in). They had a tonnage of 1,537 port tonneaux. Their crew numbered 705 officers and ratings during wartime. They were fitted with three masts and ship rigged.

The muzzle-loading, smoothbore armament of the Téméraire class consisted of twenty-eight 36-pounder long guns on the lower gun deck and thirty 18-pounder long guns on the upper gun deck. After about 1807, the armament on the quarterdeck and forecastle varied widely between ships with differing numbers of 8-pounder long guns and 36-pounder carronades. The total number of guns varied between sixteen and twenty-eight. The 36-pounder obusiers formerly mounted on the poop deck (dunette) in older ships were removed as obsolete.

== Construction and career ==
Ordered in 1806 as Vénitien, Triton was laid down around September 1814 at the Arsenal de Rochefort and launched on 22 September 1823. The ship was completed in December 1826 and commissioned on 5 April 1834. Triton served with the Mediterranean Fleet in 1836–1837. The ship supported operations in Morocco including the Bombardment of Mogador. Decommissioned in 1847, Triton served as a floating battery in Cherbourg before being towed to Rochefort in 1849, where she was hulked before being broken up in 1870.
