= Muhammad IV of Morocco =

Sultan of Morocco 1859 to 1873

Muhammad IV محمد الرابع
- Amir al-Mu'minin; Sīdī
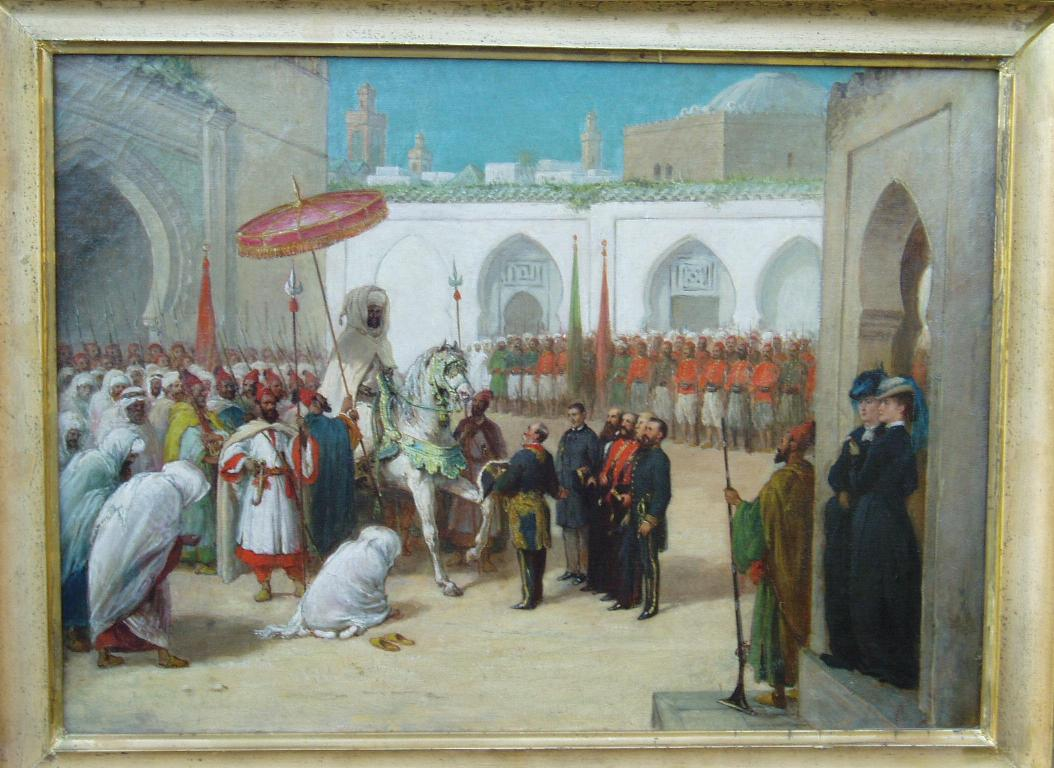
- Muhammad IV ben Abd al-Rahman of Morocco, shown surrounded by the Black Guard, receiving the John Hay Drummond Hay and British Delegation of Tangier at the royal palace in Fes.

Sultan of Morocco
- Reign: 1859–1873
- Coronation: 28 August 1859
- Predecessor: Abd al-Rahman
- Successor: Hassan I
- Born: 1803; Fes, Morocco
- Died: September 16, 1873 (aged 70); Marrakesh, Morocco
- Burial: Mausoleum of Mawlay Ali al-Sharif, Tafilalt, Morocco
- Spouse: Lalla Safiya bint Maimun bin Mohammed al-Alaoui; Lalla Ahnya al-Arusiya; Jeanne Lanternier
- Issue: 18 children, including: Hassan bin Mohammed 'Arafa bin Mohammed
Names
- Muhammad bin Abd al-Rahman bin Hisham bin Muhammad bin Abdallah bin Ismail bin Sharif bin Ali al-'Alawi محمد بن عبد الرحمن بن هشام بن محمد بن عبد الله بن إسماعيل بن الشريف بن علي العلوي
- House: 'Alawi
- Father: Abd al-Rahman bin Hisham
- Mother: Lalla Halima bint Sulayman al-Alaoui
- Religion: Maliki Sunni Islam

Sīdī Muḥammad ibn ʿAbd al-Raḥmān (Note: Arabic: محمد بن عبد الرحمن) (1803 – 16 September 1873), commonly known as Muhammad IV, (Note: Arabic: محمد الرابع) was the Sultan of Morocco from 28 August 1859 to 16 September 1873 as a ruler of the 'Alawi dynasty. He was proclaimed sultan in 1859 after the death of his father, Abd al-Rahman.

His reign saw a series of reforms to modern military equipment and organization and also the introduction of new technology, like the steam engine and the expansion of printing, mostly in religious instruction books, but also those in engineering and science. He aimed to counter European influence on Morocco even before his reign started; Ottoman Algeria had just been conquered by France in 1830, and military losses in the Battle of Isly (commanded by him) with France in 1844 made him realise that he needed to replicate the tactics of the Europeans. Despite important reforms, this failed during the disappointing defeat against Spain in the 1860 Battle of Tetuan, after which the resulting Treaty of Wad Ras imposed an indemnity payment twenty times the government's budget. He was succeeded by his son Hassan I.

== Biography ==
=== Military commander ===
During his father's reign, the neighbouring Regency of Algiers was invaded by France in 1830, and Muhammad commanded the Moroccan army which was defeated by the French at the Battle of Isly in August 1844 during the Franco-Moroccan War.

After the defeat, with his father's permission, Mawlay Muhammad used his capacity as army chief to launch a series of significant military reforms in 1845. Unlike the Ottoman Empire and Egypt, where opposition against meaningful reforms by the janissaries and the Mamluks was blocked by entrenched military groups, there was less opposition in reforms in Morocco. The core army units of gish and na'iba were left intact when the first tabors, or battalion-strength units of the 'askar nizami, were created in 1845. And there was a totally new nomenclature for ranks and organization, often provided by Ottoman and Egyptian military manuals. The men wore European-style uniforms and carried flintlock rifles made in England. The new units were infantry, as opposed to the old-style mounted cavalry, enabling the Moroccans to replicate the tactics that had produced the concentrated firepower the French had displayed at Isly. The first adversary against whom they were deployed in the 1840s was the popular resistance hero Abd al-Kader, hounded around western Algeria by Moroccan auxiliaries. This use of the 'askar nizami against the native hero dampened popular enthusiasm for the new army, and in the course of time, many soldiers deserted.

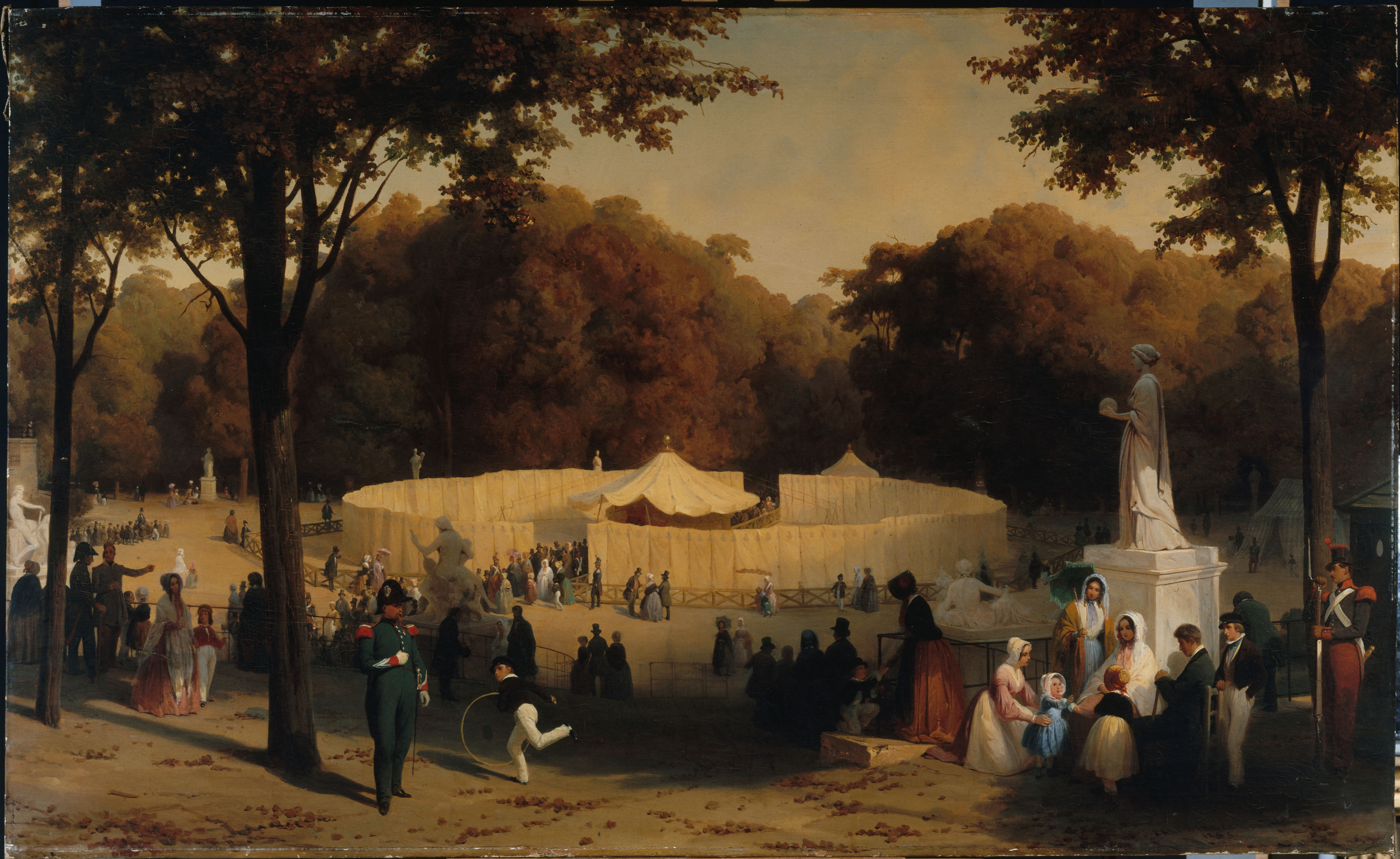
Tent of Sidi Muhammad ibn Abd al-Rahman while he was commander of the army

He invited a group of officers from Ottoman Tunisia who had served in the Ottoman army to raise and train the first European-style regiment, the askari, as a supplement to the usual palace guards ('abid) and tribal troops (ghish and nu'aib). Muhammad IV set up the Madrasa of al-Muhandiseen, a military engineering school in Fes, supervised by the renegade French Count Joseph de Saulty (an artillery officer from Algiers, de Saulty defected after an amorous entanglement, and converted, taking up the name Abd al-Rahman al-Ali). Muhammad IV hired writers to translate various European textbooks on engineering and science. He was personally involved in the translation of the works of scientists such as Legendre, Newton and Lalande. He also struck deals with British Gibraltar and Egypt to receive regular contingents of Moroccan soldiers for artillery training.

== Reign ==
=== Early reign ===
The new sultan did not outwardly resemble a modernizer. yet he was engaged with contemporary reformist ideas and was aware of the technological development elsewhere in the region.

=== Hispano-Moroccan War ===
Immediately upon ascension to throne in August 1859, Muhammad IV was faced with his first test, the Spanish-Moroccan War under Isabella II of Spain. Raids by irregular tribesmen on the Spanish enclaves of Ceuta and Melilla in northwest Morocco prompted Spain to demand an expansion of the borders of its enclave around Ceuta. When this was refused by Muhammad IV, Spain declared war. The Spanish navy bombarded Tangier, Asilah and Tetuan. A large Spanish expeditionary force landed in Ceuta, which subsequently went on to defeat the Moroccan army at the Battle of Tétouan in February 1860. The Treaty of Wad Ras signed in April 1860 expanded the enclaves, but more worrisomely imposed a large indemnity payment on Morocco of 100 million francs, twenty times the government's budget. Provisions allowed the Spanish to hold Tetouan until it was paid. The treaty also ceded the enclave of Sidi Ifni to Spain.

==== Aftermath ====
After the disappointment of defeat and the crushing financial burden of the Spanish treaty, Muhammad IV gradually retired into passivity, dedicating himself to scholarly and intellectual interests in mathematics, geometry, astronomy, poetry and music, and leaving political affairs to be handled by his palace slave and effective vizier, Si Moussa.

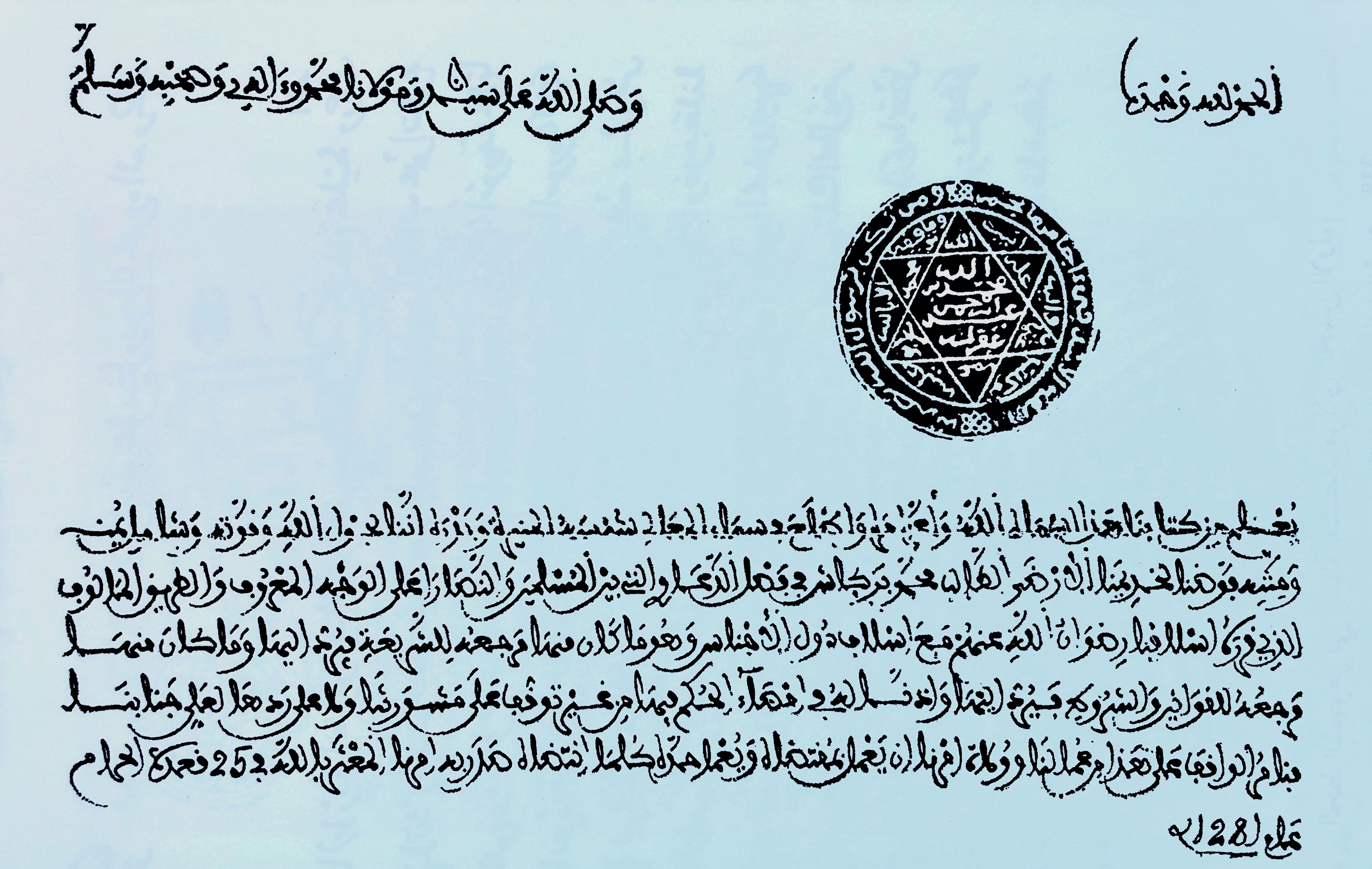
Letter from Muhammad IV dated 25 Dhu al-Qadah 1281 (April 20, 1865).

As by the Treaty of Tangier in 1863, half of the customs duties of all Moroccan ports were designated to pay the Spanish debt, the Alawite sultan's government (the Makhzen) was faced with a critical financial situation, and launched the process of "qaidization". Traditionally, the Makhzen had an understanding with the semi-autonomous rural tribes, whereby the tribal leaders agreed to hand over a portion of the taxes they collected and to supply tribesmen to the sultan's army in times of war, but otherwise were left to manage their own affairs. The new financial difficulties from the colonial encroachment prompted the Makhzen to demand ever-greater exactions of troops and taxes from the tribes. As the tribes balked and began to refuse the higher taxes, the sultan decided to circumvent the elected tribal leaders, refusing to ratify their credentials, and instead appointed qaids of his own choosing, imposing them upon the tribes. The qaids were rarely of the same tribal stock as the tribes they governed, but were instead ambitious men, chosen primarily for their ruthless ability to crush rebellion and force the tribes to cough up. Initially designed as a centralizing move, this eventually backfired, as the qaids, once esconsed in their tribal fiefs, proved even more ungovernable than the amghars had ever been. During Muhammad IV's reign, Morocco began essentially careening into feudalism, a process that accelerated during the reign of his successor, Hassan I.

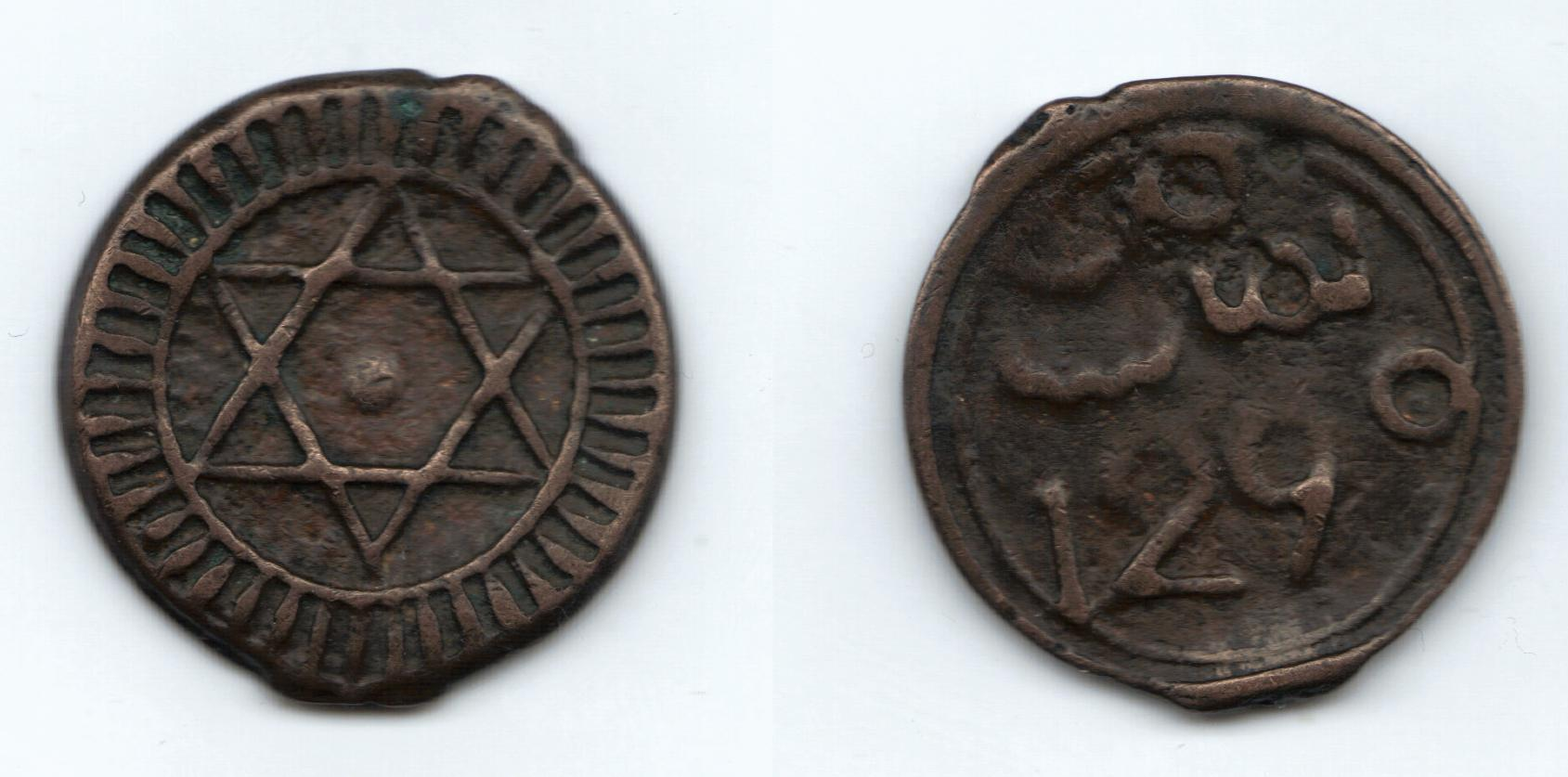
A 4 Falus coin (1873). Minted by Mohammed IV

=== Reform ===
Following the military defeats at Isly and Tetuan, a new Moroccan army was introduced, 'Askar Nizami. Well-equipped infantry were created, along with modern artillery. A steam engine was built in the palace in Marrakesh in 1863, and the first state-sponsored printing press was introduced to Morocco in 1865. By 1868, over 3,000 books, mostly religious instructions, were printed on the lithographic press in Fes. The 'Askar Nizami was subsequently reconstituted by Muhammad IV, who equipped the army with up-to-date weapons supplied by a munitions factory in Marrakesh. A military training school was built at Dar al-Makhzen in Fes, and he searched for Muslim military instructors from Algiers and Tunis to train the new army, rather than Europeans. Muhammad IV's reforms were met with minimal opposition from the Ulama.

== Death ==
On 11 September 1873, Muhammad IV drowned during a boating activity on one of the water basins of the Agdal Gardens in Marrakesh. He was buried in the Mausoleum of Moulay Ali Cherif (near present-day Rissani) in the Tafilalt.

== See also ==
- List of sultans of Morocco
- History of Morocco
- 'Alawi dynasty

== Notes ==
Preceded by Abd al-Rahman	Sultan of Morocco; 1859–1873	Succeeded by Hassan I
