= Bombardment of Mogador =

1844 French naval attack in Morocco

- Part of the Franco-Moroccan War
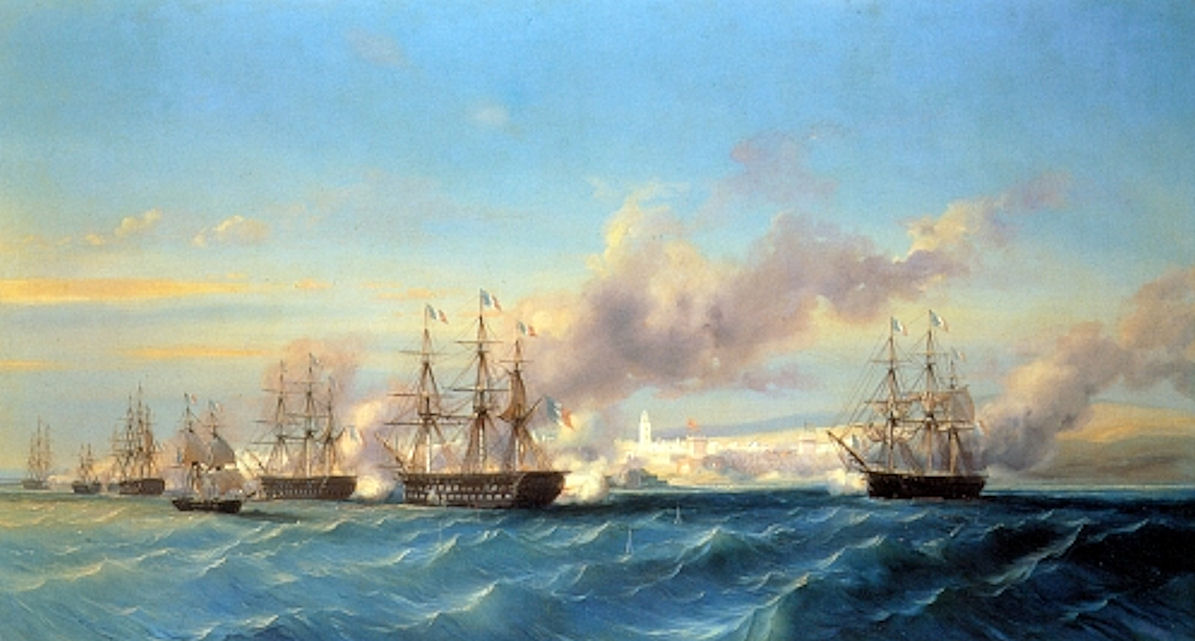
- The attack of Mogador by the French fleet, painting by Serkis Diranian.
| Date | 15–17 August 1844 |
| Location | Essaouira, Morocco 31°30′47″N 9°46′11″W |
| Result | French victory |

Belligerents
| France | Morocco |

Commanders and leaders
| François d'Orléans | Laarbi Torres; Omar Laalaj †; Ahmed ben al-Shiker |

Strength
| 15 warships 1,200 soldiers | 400-500 troops ~120 cannons |

Casualties and losses
| 14 killed 64 wounded | 200 killed 160 captured |

The Bombardment of Mogador took place August 15–17, 1844, when French Navy forces under the Prince de Joinville attacked the Moroccan city of Mogador, modern Essaouira, and the island facing the city, Mogador island. The campaign was part of the Franco-Moroccan War.

== Background ==
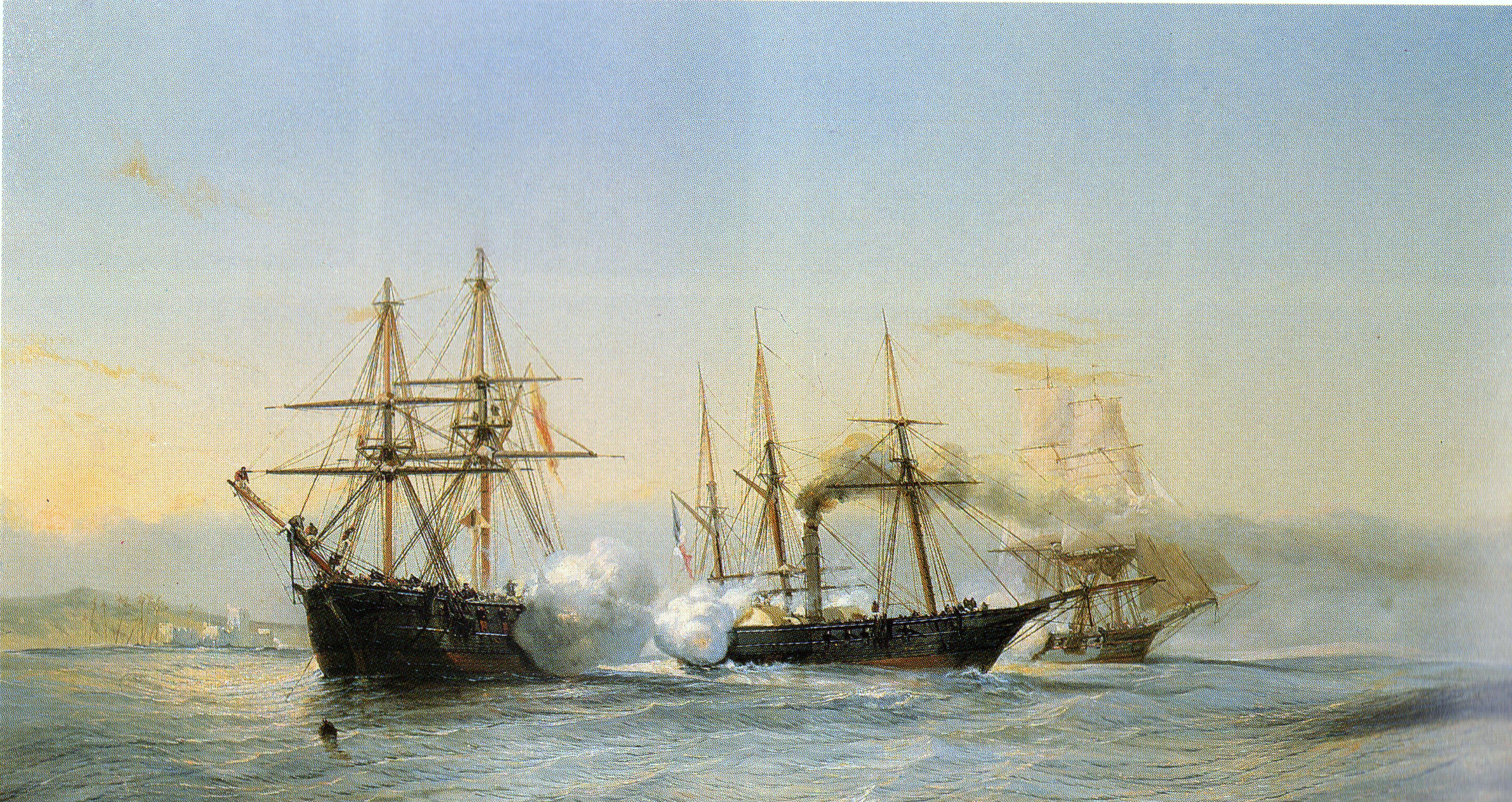
Naval combat between two Moroccan brigs and a French steam paddlewheel corvette.

The bombardment was a consequence of Morocco's alliance with Algeria's Abd-El-Kader against France. Following several incidents on the border between Algeria and Morocco, and Morocco's refusal to abandon its support of Algeria.

The bombardment of Mogador was preceded by the Bombardment of Tangier by the same fleet on 6 August 1844, and the Battle of Isly by Maréchal Bugeaud on 14 August 1844.

Mogador was an important harbour, Morocco's first seaport, with consistent relations with Europe. It had about 15,000 inhabitants, 4,000 of whom were Jews, and 50 Christian traders.

== Bombardment ==
The French fleet consisted of 15 ships, including 3 ships of the line (Suffren, Jemmapes and Triton), 3 frigates (Belle Poule, Groenland and Asmodée), 4 brigs (Argus, Volage, Rubis and Cassard), 3 corvettes (Pluton, Cassendi and Vedette), 2 avisos (Phare and Pandour). The fleet included a large proportion of steam paddleships, but most of the firepower came from traditional ships of the line.

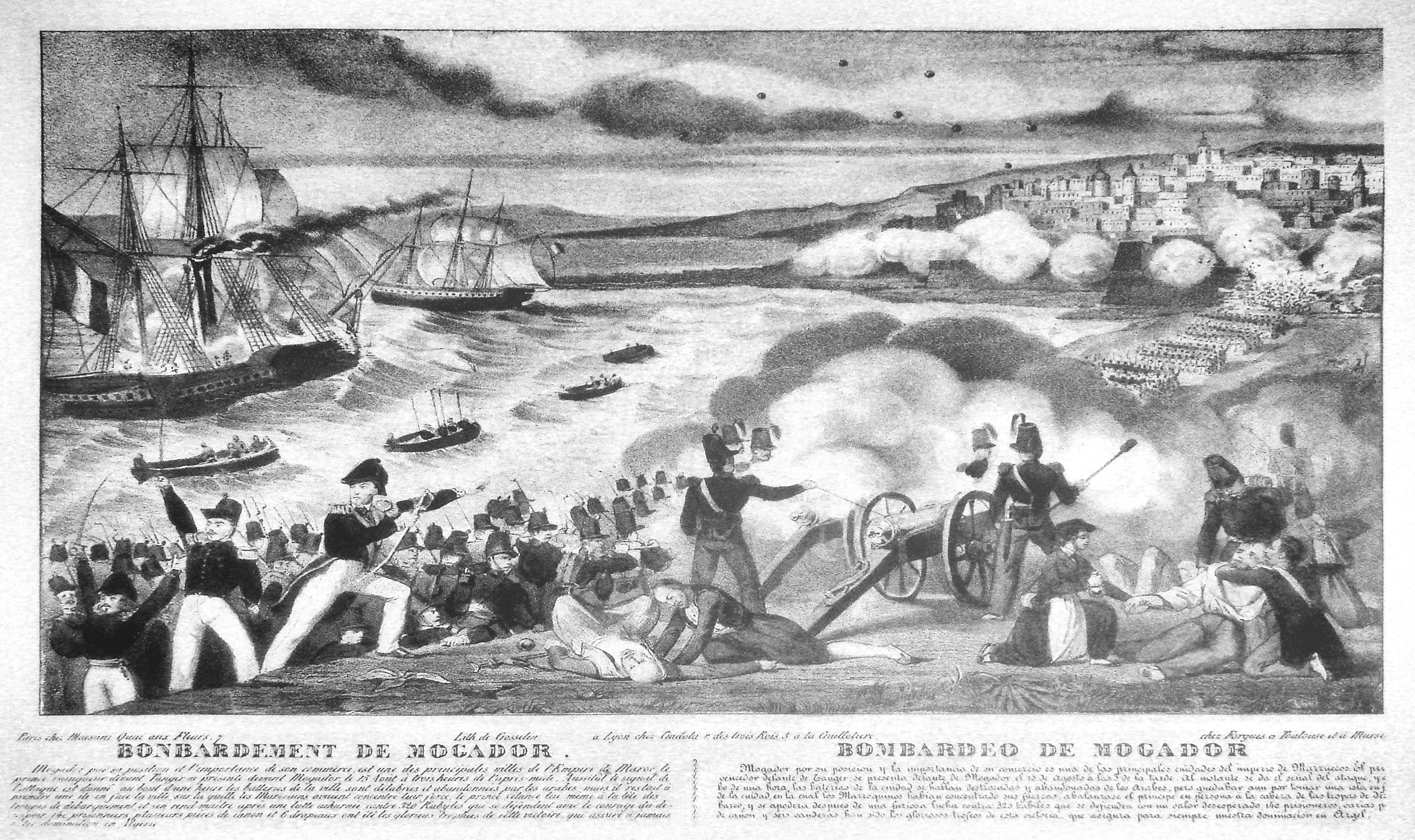
Cannons and naval mortar were both used in the bombardment.

Mogador was defended by 40 guns at the northern "Scala da la Kasbah", 24 guns at the harbourside "Scala da la Marine". Mogador island, however, was defended by 5 batteries, armed with between 6 and 70 British bombards.

The French fleet arrived in the Bay of Mogador on August 11, 1844, but the weather was so bad that they had to wait, breaking their anchors and unable to communicate even between themselves. Once the weather abated, the French Navy first took up firing positions on 15 August. They were fired upon by the Moroccan batteries first upon taking their positions. After one hour, the French batteries responded, and exchanges lasted for about 3 hours. The batteries of the city were silenced one by one, but the batteries on Mogador island remained active, requiring a landing to clear them out.

== Occupation of Mogador island ==
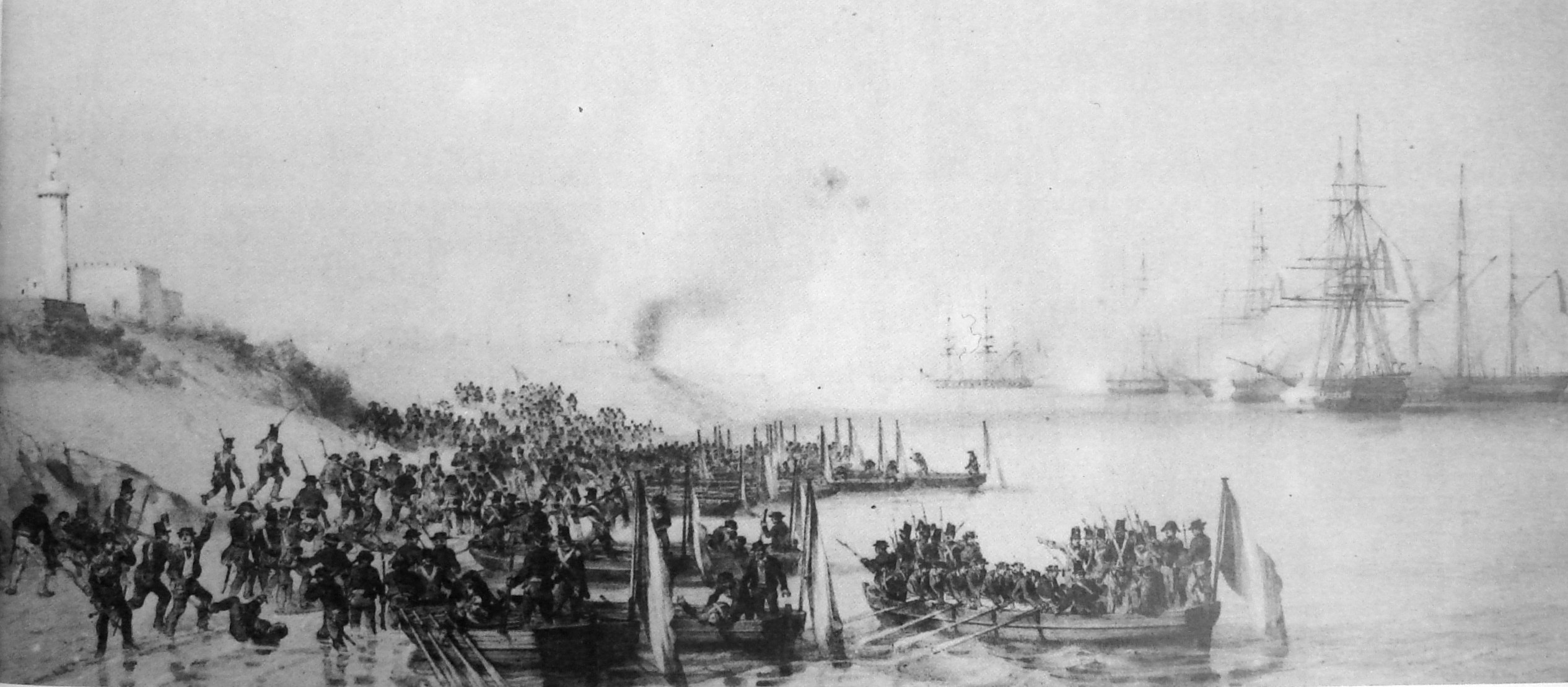
French troops disembarking on Mogador Island.

The French, numbering 500 men under the orders of Duquesne and Bouet, occupied Mogador island, which was barely populated and only built with a mosque, a prison and a few forts.

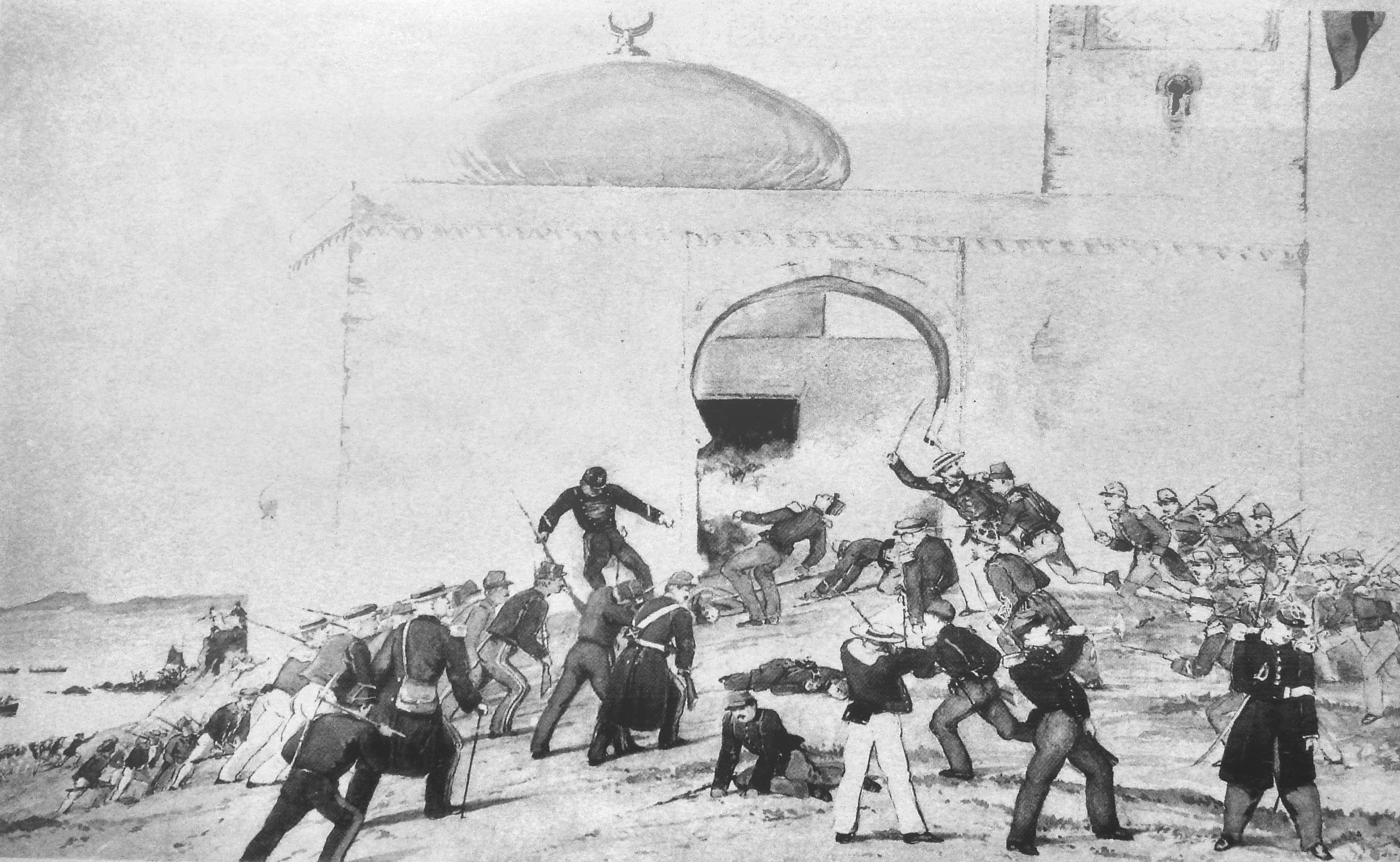
French troops attacking the Mosque of Mogador Island.

All the batteries were taken and 400 Moroccans were captured in the Mosque of the island after heavy fighting, led by their commander Laarbi Torres. The French were able to release about 50 to 60 state prisoners. The French landing force had 14 killed and 64 wounded in the action.

The city of Mogador was further bombarded from Mogador island, which was only 1.5 kilometers away. Altogether, the city was bombarded for 26 hours. A large proportion of the main mosque and the houses were destroyed by the French bombardment.

== Entering the city of Mogador ==
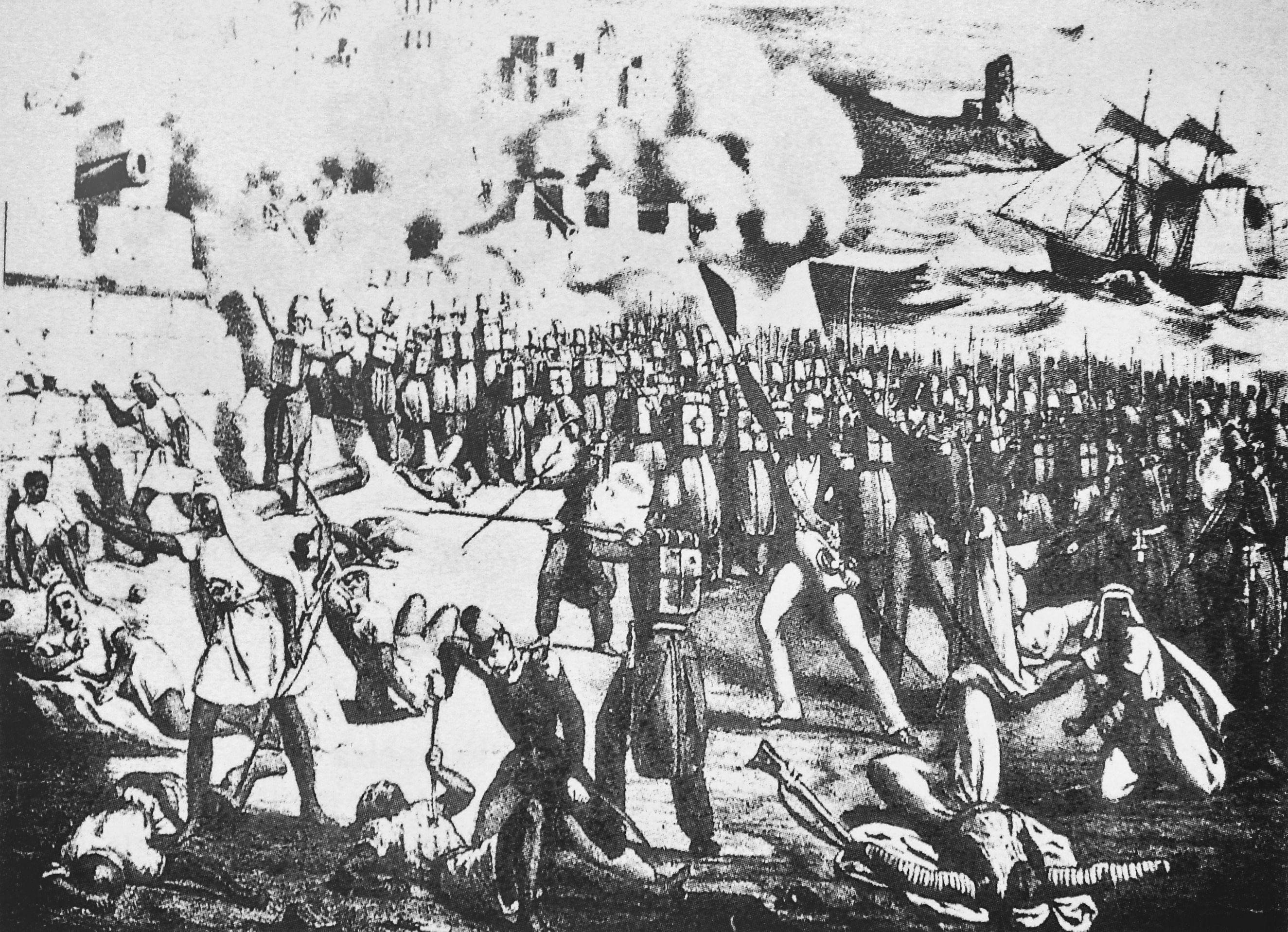
French troops disembarking in the harbour of Essaouira.

On 16 August, 600 troops were able to enter the harbour and city of Mogador, where they spiked the guns, destroyed the powder, sank the ships in the harbour, and demolished the last defenses of the city with no resistance. They did not however proceed to the center of the city, as it was considered unnecessary.

The city had been evacuated by its inhabitants. Chiadma and Haha populations from the countryside seized the opportunity to invade the city and loot it for 40 days. Joinville reported that the city was under fire, that the Berbers had routed Imperial troops, and that they had taken possession of the city.

On August 17, 1844, Joinville sent the following dispatch to the Ministry of the Navy:

On the 15th we attacked Mogador. After having destroyed the town and its batteries, we took possession of the island and the port. Seventy-eight men, of which seven are officers, have been killed and wounded. I am occupied in placing a garrison on the island, and I have ordered the blockade of the port.

— De Joinville dispatch to the Ministry of the Navy, August 17, 1844.

== Consequences ==
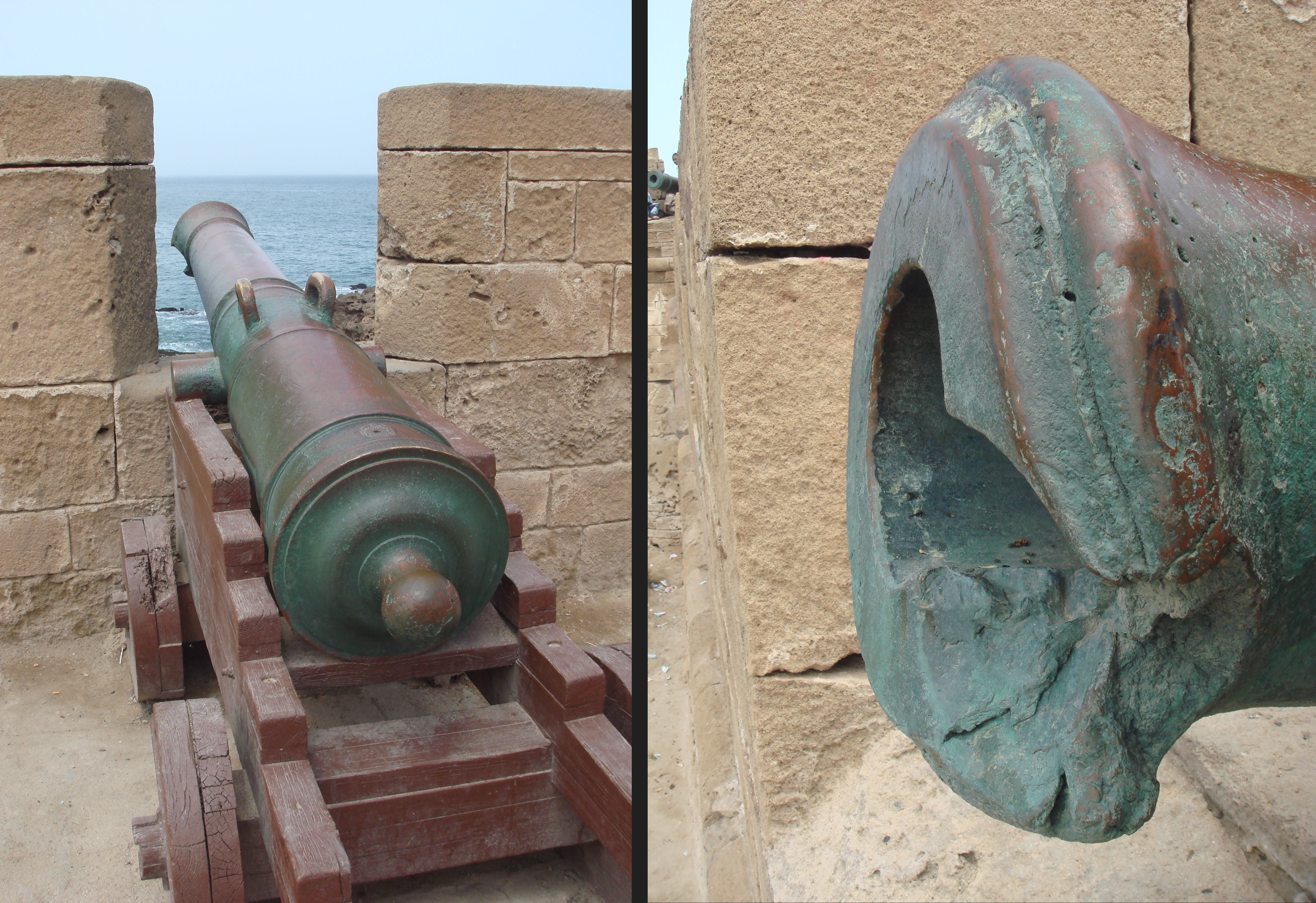
Moroccan cannon hit by a French cannonball in the Bombardment of Mogador. This was a gun of Spanish manufacture, cast in Barcelona in 1781.

On 17 August, the British Consul William Willshire was evacuated in exchange for the Moroccan prisoners that were wounded. The French Consul had already left a month before. The British Consul and his family were immediately transferred to the ship Warspite, which had been accompanying the French fleet.

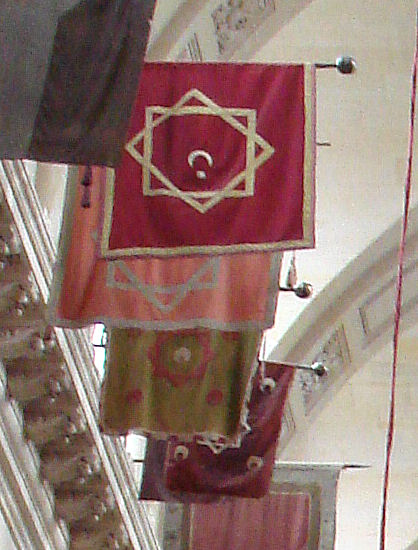
Moroccan flags at the Invalides, Paris.

On the same day, the Véloce was dispatched to Maréchal Bugeaud with the healthy Moroccan prisoners, as well as with the flags taken from the Moroccans, which were deposited with great ceremony at the Invalides on 2 September 1844.

The war formally ended September 10, 1844 with the signing of the Treaty of Tangier, in which Morocco agreed to arrest and outlaw Abd al-Qadir, reduce the size of its garrison at Oujda, and establish a commission to demarcate the border. The French forces evacuated Mogador on September 16, 1844.

The border, which is essentially the modern border between Morocco and Algeria, was agreed in the Treaty of Lalla Maghnia.

Following the signature of the treaty, on 4 July 1845, the Véloce brought back the 123 Moroccan prisoners, and remitted them.

The conflict increased tensions between France and the United Kingdom, which were considered by some to be on the brink of war.
