= Morocco World News =

English-language online newspaper published in Morocco

- Type: Online newspaper
- Format: e-newspaper
- Founders: Samir Bennis; Adnane Bennis
- Editor-in-chief: Safaa Kasraoui
- Founded: 2011; 15 years ago
- Language: English
- Website: moroccoworldnews.com

Morocco World News (MWN) is a Moroccan online newspaper published in English. It was founded in 2011 by Samir Bennis and Adnane Bennis. Based in Rabat, it covers national and international news. It publishes content on topics including politics, economic affairs, culture, and migration.

== Overview ==
Morocco World News was founded in 2011 in New York by brothers Samir Bennis and Adnane Bennis. It was established in response to what its founders perceived as a lack of English-language media coverage about Morocco.

The newspaper publishes news related to Morocco and the MENA region, covering topics such as politics, economics, international relations, technology, sports, and the Western Sahara.

== Reception ==
Scholars have described Morocco World News as a "blog" (p. 243) and a "state-affiliated source" (p. 251).

== See also ==
- List of newspapers in Morocco
- List of magazines in Morocco
