= Bombardment of Tangier =

Coordinates: 35°46′36″N 05°48′14″W

- Part of the Franco-Moroccan War
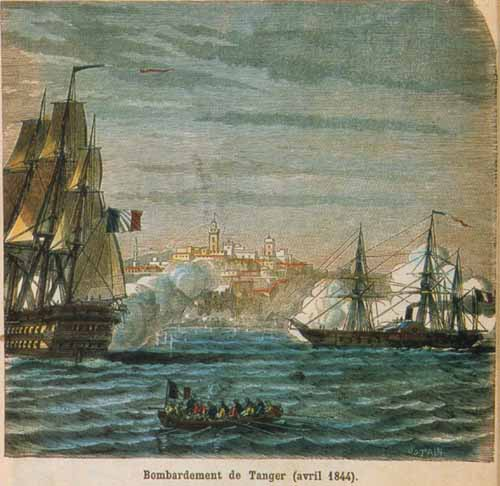
- Bombardment of Tangier, engraving by N.E. Sotain.
Date	6 August 1844
Location	Tangier, Morocco
Result	French victory

Belligerents
France	Morocco

Commanders and leaders
François d'Orléans	Ben Abbou

Strength
15 warships 13 other ships	1,000 cavalry 105 cannons

Casualties and losses
3 killed 17 wounded	150 killed 400 wounded

The Bombardment of Tangier took place on 6 August 1844, when French Navy forces under the command of François d'Orléans, Prince of Joinville attacked the Moroccan city of Tangier. The campaign was part of the First Franco-Moroccan War.

The bombardment was a consequence of Morocco's alliance with Algeria's Abd-El-Kader against France following several incidents at the border between Algeria and Morocco, and the refusal of Morocco to abandon its support for Algeria.

The Bombardment of Tangier was followed up by the Battle of Isly on 14 August 1844, and the Bombardment of Mogador by the same fleet on 15 August 1844.

== Gallery ==
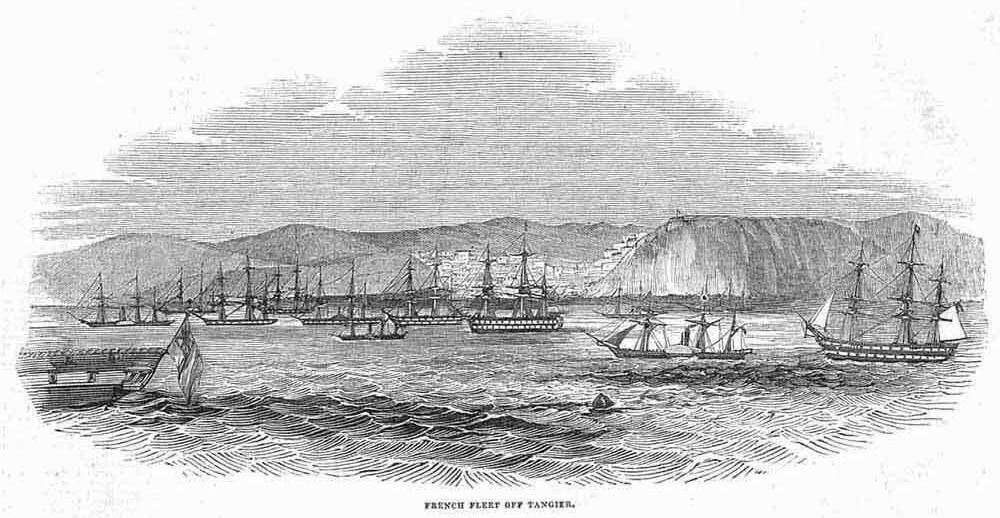
French fleet off Tangier, The Illustrated London News.

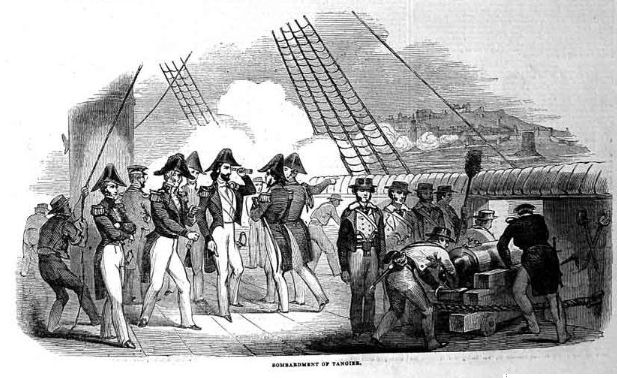
French bombardment of Tangier, The Illustrated London News.
