= Battle of Isly =

1844 battle of the Franco-Moroccan War

- Part of the Franco-Moroccan War
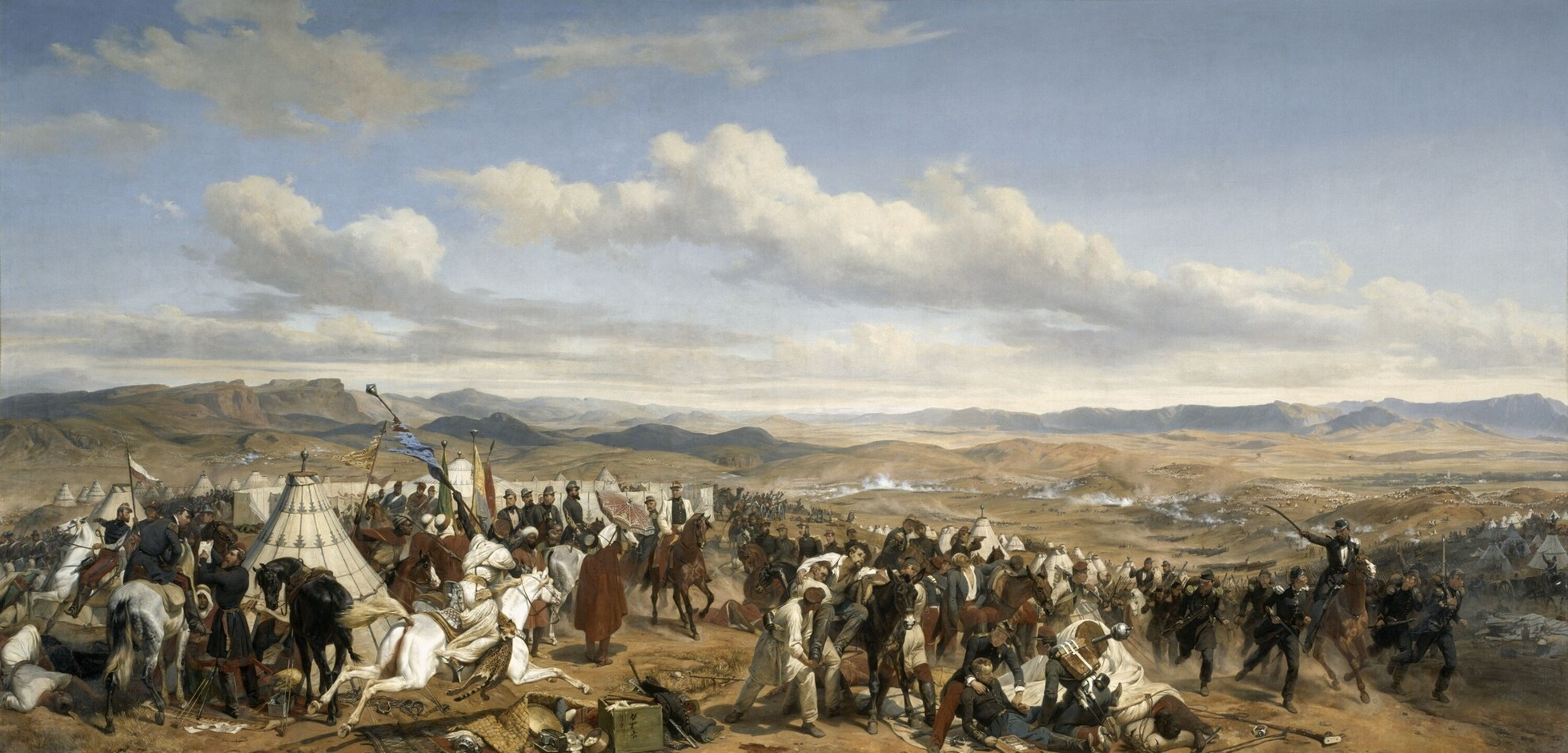
- Battle of Isly; Horace Vernet, 1844–1846
Date	14 August 1844
Location	Near Oujda, Morocco 34°41′24″N 1°55′48″W
Result	French victory

Belligerents
France	Morocco

Commanders and leaders
Thomas Robert Bugeaud; Joseph Vantini	Abd al-Rahman; Muhammad IV

Strength
10,400 soldiers	45,000 soldiers

Casualties and losses
27 killed 99 wounded	800 killed 1,500 wounded 11 artillery
- Location of the Battle of Isly

The Battle of Isly (Arabic: معركة إيسلي) was fought on August 14, 1844, between France and Morocco, near the Isly River. French forces under Marshal Thomas Robert Bugeaud routed a much larger, but poorly organized, Moroccan force, mainly fighters from the tribes of Beni Snassen, but also from the Beni Angad and Beni Oukil; under Muhammad, son of the Sultan of Morocco, Abd al-Rahman. Bugeaud, attempting to complete the French conquest of Algeria, instigated the battle without a declaration of war in order to force negotiations concerning Moroccan support for the Algerian resistance leader Abd el-Kader to conclude on terms favorable to the French who demanded the Sultan of Morocco to withdraw support for Abd el-Kader.

Bugeaud, who recovered the Moroccan commander's tent and umbrella (equivalent to capturing a military standard in European warfare), was made Duke of Isly for his victory.

The day following the battle, the Bombardment of Mogador started.

== Background ==
Since the Invasion of Algiers in 1830, Emir Abd el-Kader had taken lead of the tribes of the region of Mascara to oppose the French in 1832. A first treaty, signed by General Desmichels in 1834, was deemed too favorable to him. in 1837, Marshal Bugeaud was therefore instructed to sign a new one, the Treaty of Tafna, which required Abd el-Kader to recognize the sovereignty of France in North Africa, in exchange for which France recognized the authority of Abd el-Kader over a large part of Algeria; the whole Beylik of Oran (with the exception of the cities of Oran, Arzew, Mostaganem and Mazagran), the Beylik of Titteri and the Beylik of Algiers (with the exception of the cities of Algiers and Blida), as well as the plain of Mitidja and the Algerian Sahel.

The Sultan of Morocco Abd al-Rahman attempted seizing Tlemcen from the French in October 1830. The Sultan sent 5,000 cavalry and infantry. Moroccan soldiers rampaged through the streets of Tlemcen, looting and fighting. The Sultan eventually had to retreat them in the face of French diplomatic and naval pressure.

He fled to Morocco looking to gain support to continue the war from the Sultan of Morocco Abd al-Rahman, as well as the concession of the territory located between Oujda and the Tafna River. Abd el-Kader had raised a real army, and in November 1839, supported by the Sultan of Morocco Abd al-Rahman, he declared war on France, following the crossing of the Bibans (Iron Gates) by the French army.

In reaction, the French then truly undertook the systematic conquest of the country, which the July monarchy made a reason for national pride and military heroism. This conquest was the work of Marshal Bugeaud, appointed governor in 1840. Algeria's major cities fell and Abd el-Kader saw his mobile encampment destroyed in Taguin in 1843 following the Battle of the Smala and was driven back into the desert. He then took refuge in Morocco, but, at the same time, the army of Sultan Abd al-Rahman was defeated at Isly, while the French fleet bombarded the ports of Tangier and Mogador.

== Prelude ==
On the 30th of May, French troops of General Bedeau had to repel a Moroccan attack. The Moroccan Qaid crossed the border into Lalla Maghnia, a place sixty kilometres from Tlemcen, and attacked the French camp with his Moroccan cavalry. The attack was soon repulsed by General Lamoricière. The next day Marshal Bugeaud embarked at Algiers. On the 15th of June, Moroccan troops fired upon French troops, wounding Captain Daumas and two men, demanding that the border must be set back to the Tafna River. On the 19th, French troops occupied Oujda.

On the 6th of August, Tangier had been bombarded by French ships commanded by François d'Orléans, a son of the King of France, Louis Phillippe I.

== Battle ==
The Governor General having assembled all his forces, made up of 11,000 men, marched on the Moroccan camp established at Djarf el-Akhdar, a short distance from Oujda, on the right bank of the Isly River, a sub-tributary of the Tafna River.

Having to deal almost exclusively with cavalry, he had formed from his infantry a large diamond whose faces were themselves made up of small squares. The cavalry was in the interior of the lozenge which marched through one of its angles duly provided with artillery.

At daybreak, seeing the French army advance, the Sultan sent the Moroccan cavalry with a mass of 20,000 to 25,000 cavalry. This charge did not succeed in forcing the lines of tirailleurs, and was soon separated in two by the squares of the advancing cavalry. Bugeaud then brought out his cavalry. This formed by echelons, charged the Moroccan cavalry which was to the left of the army and dispersed it after having defeated several hundred of its cavalry. The first echelon, composed of six squadrons of spahis commanded by Colonel Joseph, rushed to a Moroccan camp and captured eleven pieces of artillery. The Moroccan artillerymen did not have time to reload.

The Moroccan infantry dispersed in ravines where the French cavalry could not pursue them. While the first echelon marched on the camp, the second commanded by Colonel Morris moved on the part of the Moroccan cavalry which was on the right. It was a difficult endeavor. After it was over, the French army concentrated on the Moroccan camp, and soon set out in pursuit to prevent them from rallying.

== Consequences ==
As a result of the battle, the French captured eleven pieces of artillery, eighteen flags, and all the Moroccan tents. The Moroccans had 800 of their men killed when the French had 27 of their men killed and 99 of them wounded.

As a consequence of the battle and French naval actions the Moroccans sued for peace, declaring Abd al-Qadir "mufsid" or a ‘corrupter’ instead of a true holy warrior. Relations between Abd al-Qadir and the Moroccans would deteriorate until a full blown conflict would eventually erupt for control of the border regions.

After three years of guerrilla warfare, Abd el-Kader would surrender to Lamoricière in 1847.
