= Betsey (ship) =

Many ships have been named Betsey or Betsy:

- Betsey (1768 ship) was a slave ship launched at Liverpool in 1768 that made several voyages transporting slaves from West Africa to the Caribbean until the British Royal Navy purchased her in 1777. The Navy sold her in 1778.
- Betsey (1787 ship) was launched in 1787 at Newfoundland. She sailed to England and initially she traded between Bristol and the Mediterranean. In 1792 she made one complete voyage as a slave ship in the triangular trade in enslaved people before a French privateer captured her on her second slave voyage after she had embarked slaves in West Africa and was bringing them to Jamaica.
- Betsey (1790 ship) was launched at Liverpool as a slave ship. She made six complete voyages as a slaver. A French privateer captured her in 1799 after she had delivered her slaves on her seventh voyage.
- Betsey (1791 ship) was launched in Bermuda in 1791. By 1793 she was a Liverpool privateer. In 1798 the French captured her as she was on her way to acquire enslaved people from the Windward Coast to carry them to the West Indies.
- Betsy (1793 ship) was launched at Lancaster as a West Indiaman. In 1801 she made one voyage for the British East India Company (EIC). On her return she became a Baltic trader, but was lost in 1803.
- Betsey (1800 ship), was launched at Bristol in 1800, and sailed as a West Indiaman. American privateers captured her twice in 1813 but each time she was recaptured. She was last listed in 1825.
- Betsey (1801 ship) was launched in 1801 at Calcutta, India. Around 1814 new owners renamed her Marquis of Wellington. As Marquis of Wellington she transported convicts to New South Wales. She was returning to England in 1818 when she was wrecked there.
- Betsey (1801 Poole ship) was launched at Poole. She made two voyages as a slave ship. French privateers captured her on the second voyage but the British Royal Navy recaptured her. Afterwards she was briefly a West Indiaman. She was wrecked in February 1807.
- Betsey (1803 ship) was a ship launched at Chittagong that wrecked at New Zealand in 1815.
- Betsey (schooner) was a schooner wrecked in the China Sea in 1805

Citations
