= Bombardment of Tangier (1791) =

- Part of Spanish-Moroccan War of 1790–1791
Date	24 August 1791
Location	Tangier
Result	Moroccan victory

Belligerents
Kingdom of Spain	Sultanate of Morocco

Commanders and leaders
(Spain) Javier Morales de los Ríos	(Morocco) Sidi Ali ben Ahmed

Strength
14 ships; 2 frigates; 6 gunboats; 6 bombardiers	Unknown

Casualties and losses
Some casualties and damages to the ships	Light damage

The bombardment of Tangier was a naval attack launched on August 24, 1791, by Spain against the Moroccan city of Tangier in response to the Moroccan sultan Moulay Yazid's declaration of war and siege of Ceuta.

Following the failure of peace attempts between Spain and Morocco, Spanish King Charles IV also officially declared war on Morocco and ordered the bombardment of Tangier. The city of Tangier was a well-known departure point for Moroccan privateers, who captured or hindered Spanish merchants. The bombardment was intended to stop these activities and, above all, to encourage a rebellion by the local population against the Sultan, who had been besieging Ceuta since September 25, 1790. News of the upcoming Spanish navy arrived to Moulay Yazid. The inhabitants of Tangier evacuated the city before their arrival. Moulay Yazid entrusted the defenses to Sidi Ali ben Ahmed and recruited the tribes there for a holy war, which he did.

A light Spanish squadron was sent under the command of Lieutenant-General Javier Morales de los Ríos. It reached Tangier Bay on August 23 and began bombarding the port on the 24th, from five in the morning until three in the afternoon. Weather conditions forced the Spanish fleet to withdraw. The city of Tangier, which had been fortified in the knowledge of an imminent attack, suffered very little damage, while the Spanish sustained some casualties and damages to the ships due to Moroccan artillery fire.

== Sources ==
- Carmona Portillo, Antonio (2004). Las relaciones hispano-marroquíes a finales del siglo XVIII y el cerco de Ceuta de 1790-1791 (in Spanish). Málaga, Spain: Editorial Sarriá. ISBN 84-95129-90-6.
- Ismaël Hamet (1923), Histoire du Maghreb.
- Nicolas Viton de Saint-Allais (1826), L'art de vérifier les dates, Volume 3, Part 3.
