= Tahar ben Abdelhak Fennish =

Moroccan diplomat

Tahar ben Abdelhak Fennish was a Moroccan diplomat.

== Career ==
After a tenure as the Sultan's ambassador to London starting in 1773, Fennish was appointed as Morocco's ambassador to the Netherlands and subsequently France in 1777.

His diplomatic duties involved navigating a conflict between Morocco and France over captive disputes, triggered by the sinking of a French ship, La Louise, near Boujdour in 1775. The Sultan assigned Fennish to negotiate the captives' release, leading him to Paris in 1778, where he interacted with King Louis XVI. Successful talks led to mutual recognition of titles between Morocco and France.

Concurrently, Fennish played a crucial role in securing the Treaty of Friendship and Amity with the newly independent United States of America. His duties also included discussions with American officials Thomas Barclay and Thomas Jefferson.

Fennish, a qaid and commander of the Moroccan artillery, was noted for his diplomatic acumen, pivotal in fostering international relations for Morocco during this period.
