= Lalla Balqis =

Slave concubine

Lalla Balqis also known as Lalla Bilqis (c. 1670 – after 1721), was an English slave concubine of Sultan Ismail Ibn Sharif (r. 1672–1727).

== Life ==
She was of English origin. In 1685, when she was fifteen years old, she and her mother were travelling to the English colony of Barbados, when their ship was attacked by Barbary pirates. They were taken to the slave market in Morocco, where she was given as a gift to Sultan Ismail. She was converted to Islam under the name Balqis or Bilqis, and included in his harem. Her mother was however released and allowed to return to England with gifts and a letter of peace from the Sultan to king Charles II of England.

=== Concubine ===
Lalla Balqis came to be a favorite of the sultan. It was reported that "The English Woman, who knows how to keep in her Favour, as well as the King's, has also more Liberty than the rest, and commonly bears her Company." At one occasion, a group of English captives noted that when they were taken ashore to Meknès, they were offered "Rice, brackish Sherbet, and dry'd musty Fish" because Moulay Ismail's 'favourite Sultana's; an English Woman ... was that very Day brought to Bed of a Son'. As favorite, she had some influence over the Sultan, who sometimes agreed to her requests. Balqis was described as 'Affable, Courteous, and willing to do a good Turn' to anyone.

She came to be known among Europeans as the influential "Englishwoman" in the harem, and European priests and diplomats often successfully petitioned her for mediation with the Sultan when working to achieve the release of Europeans enslaved in Morocco. She expressed herself always willing to help in such matters and often managed to mediate with the Sultan, securing the release of Europeans in exchange for the release of Moroccan galley slaves held in Europe, a task she officially referred to have performed in order to induce the king of France to manumit Moroccan galley-slaves. It was not unknown for Europeans to keep beneficial diplomatic contacts with "Reinagodo queens", former compatriots who had been enslaved in foreign harems. In a report from 1676, Mohammed Trik, the Dey of Algiers, is noted to have been married to another former slave concubine, described as a "cunning covetous English woman, who would sell her soule for a Bribe", with whom the English viewed it as "chargeable to bee kept in her favour... for Countrysake".

During the negotiations between Morocco and Great Britain in 1721, resulting in the Peace treaty of 1722, Lalla Balqis was one of the influential harem women who was given diplomatic gifts by the British ambassador Charles Stewart. The sultan, reportedly, granted Stewart 'everything he came for' because he 'loved the English'.

== See also ==
- Marthe Franceschini
- Helen Gloag
- Jeanne Lanternier
