= Hamdun ibn al-Hajj al-Fasi =

Moroccan academic

Personal life
- Born: Abu al-Fayd Hamdun ibn Abd al-Rahman ibn Hamdun ibn Abd al-Rahman Mohammed ibn al-Hajj al-Fasi al-Sulami al-Mirdasi; 1760 Fez, Morocco
- Died: 1817 (aged 56–57) Morocco
- Notable works: Silsilat Dhakhair al-turath al-adabi bi-al-Maghrib; Commentary on Ibn Hajar al-Asqalani's Muqaddimah; Gloss on Taftazani's treatise on the Mukhtasar; Diwan including a controversial poem dedicated to Amir Sau'ud b. 'Abd al-'Aziz
- Known for: His poetry and scholarly works, including critiques of Sufi practices
- Occupation: Scholar, poet, Tijani Sufi

Religious life
- Religion: Islam

Hamdun ibn al Hajj (Arabic: حمدون بن الحاج المرداسي) or in full Abu al-Fayd Hamdun ibn Abd al-Rahman ibn Hamdun ibn Abd al-Rahman Mohammed ibn al-Hajj al-Fasi al-Sulami al-Mirdasi (1760–1817) was one of the most outstanding scholars of the reign of Moulay Sulayman of Morocco. He was a committed Tijani Sufi but also an outspoken critic of some of the practices of Sufism in that time. Hamdun ibn al Hajj was also one of the best known poets of the period and author of a diwan (Silsilat Dhakhair al-turath al-adabi bi-al-Maghrib). He also wrote a commentary on Ibn Hajar al-Asqalani's Muqaddimah, a gloss on Taftazani's treatise on the Mukhtasar and a series of Diwans including a controversial poem dedicated to Amir Sau'ud b. 'Abd al-'Aziz.
