= Helen Gloag =

Moroccan royal slave consort

Helen Gloag (29 January 1750 – c. 1790) was a Scottish woman who was taken into slavery. She was an influential favourite slave consort of Mohammed ben Abdallah the Sultan of Morocco, and as such has been famously referred to in Scottish history as the "Empress of Morocco".

However, despite her account, some doubt that she ever lived in Morocco. Dr. Lempriere, who was granted permission to visit Sidi Mohammed's harem in 1789, made no mention of a Scottish slave, concubine, or wife named Helen.

== Life ==
Gloag was born on 29 January 1750 to blacksmith Andrew Gloag and his wife Ann Kay in the village of Wester Pett, just south of Muthill in Perthshire, and was the eldest of four siblings. Her father remarried after her mother died, but Helen did not have a good relationship with her stepmother, and left home at the age of 19 to take a passage from Greenock to South Carolina. The ship was captured by Barbary corsairs, pirates from Morocco, two weeks into the voyage.

=== Slave consort ===
After capture, the men were killed and the women were taken to the slave market in Algiers. Gloag was purchased by a wealthy Moroccan and handed over to Sultan Sidi Mohammid ben Abdullah. Due to her beauty, red hair, and green eyes, the Sultan added her to his harem. His infatuation toward her resulted in her becoming his fourth wife and eventually a favourite wife. She was not the first slave wife of the Sultan: he was also married to Marthe Franceschini (1755–1799), another European woman captured and enslaved by Corsairs.

In Scotland, she is claimed to have been given the title of Empress. This is however not to be taken literally. The Europeans often referred to the Sultan as "Emperor" or "King", and to the Sultan's consorts as "Empress" or "Queen", which was the equivalent titles of their own rulers and their own ruler's wives; and whenever a woman entered the harem of the Sultan they referred to it as a "marriage", even when this may simply have been slave concubinage. The habit of Europeans to equalize local customs to their own equivalents in this way may have caused confusion. In reality, there was no equivalent of an Empress consort or a Queen consort at a Muslim court, where the ruler could have many wives and concubines, and his four wives were to be treated equally according to Islamic law. The first royal consort to bear an official title in Morocco is in fact Lalla Salma.

As a favourite of the Sultan, Helen Gloag had some influence in the harem. Her intervention was said to be instrumental in the releases of seafarers and slaves captured by the Salé pirates. Gloag was able to write home and to receive visits in Morocco from her brother Robert, who was responsible for her story finding its way back to Scotland. She became credited for a reduction in activities of Moroccan-based pirates, though this might also have been because of an increase in the number of British and French warships present due to the increasing tensions before the Napoleonic Wars.

=== Later life ===
Sultan Sidi Mohammid ibn Abdullah died in 1790 and his throne was seized by Mulai Yazeed, a son of the Sultan. Yazeed consolidated his hold by killing any possible competition, including Helen's two sons. It is presumed that Helen was also killed during the following two years of unrest.

== See also ==
- Lalla Bilqis
