= Hisham bin Mohammed =

Hisham bin Mohammed هشام بن محمد

Sultan of Morocco
- Reign: 1792–1797
- Predecessor: al-Yazid bin Mohammed
- Successor: Sulayman bin Mohammed
- Born: 1748
- Died: July 1798 (aged 49–50); Marrakesh, Morocco
- Issue: Sultan Moulay Abd al-Rahman
- House: 'Alawi dynasty
- Father: Sidi Mohammed ben Abdallah
- Mother: Princess Lalla Fatima bint Suleiman
- Religion: Sunni Islam

Moulay Hisham ben Mohammed (Arabic: هشام بن محمد), born in 1748 and died in July 1798 in Marrakesh, was Sultan of Morocco from 1792 to 1797. He was proclaimed sultan during the reign of his half-brother Yazid of Morocco, and ended up abandoning the throne when his followers proclaimed Sulayman bin Mohammed their legitimate ruler.

== Life ==
Moulay Hisham was a son of Sidi Mohammed III and his wife Princess Lalla Fatima bint Suleiman. He was proclaimed Sultan in 1792 by the Marrakesh inhabitants, the Rhamna and the Houz tribes during the reign of Sultan Moulay Yazid. At Tâzkourt happened a battle between Moulay Hisham and his half-brother Sultan Moulay Zayid who was victorious but perished few days later on February 23, 1792, succumbing to an injury. When Moulay Yazid died in 1792, Moulay Sulayman was proclaimed Sultan in Fez and in 1797 Moulay Hicham was abandoned by his supporters who recognized Moulay Sulayman as their legitimate sovereign and abnegated Moulay Hicham as their sultan. As a fallen sovereign, he initially found asylum at zaouia el-Cherradi, before being assigned a residence in Rabat by Moulay Sulayman, until he was granted permission to travel to Marrakesh where he died. Moulay Hicham and his wife a lady of the Jirari family are the parents of Sultan Moulay Abderrahmane, Moulay Sulayman's designed heir.
