= Abd al-Qadir ibn Shaqrun =

Ibn Shaqrūn or Abū Muḥammad (or Abū Naṣr) ʿAbd al-Qādir ibn al-ʿArabī al-Munabbahī al-Madag̲h̲rī ibn Shaqrūn al-Miknāsī (Arabic: أبو محمد عبد القادر بن العربي المَنَبَّهي المدغري بن شقرون; died after 1727/28) was a Moroccan physician and poet and contemporary of Moulay Ismael. He is not to be confused with Abd al-Qadir ibn Shaqrun al-Fasi (died 1801 or 1804), a religious scholar from Fes, who played an active role in the accession of Mulay Slimane as a member of the so-called ahl al-hadith group.
