= Moroccan seizure of the Betsey =

1784 naval capture

Date	October 11, 1784
Location	Off the coast of Cádiz, Spain
Result	Moroccan victory

Belligerents
Sultanate of Morocco	United States

Casualties and losses
Unknown	1 ship captured

The Moroccan seizure of the Betsey was an incident in which Moroccan naval forces captured the Philadelphia merchant ship Betsey on October 11, 1784. After delays by the United States government to sign a treaty, the Sultan of Morocco Mohammed bin Abdallah ordered the capture of the ship. The ship and crew were taken hostage in Tangier until July 9, 1785.

== Background ==
On December 20, 1777, Morocco became the first country in the world to recognize the independence of the United States, only a year and a half after the U.S. Declaration of Independence was issued. The sultan's desire for friendly relations with the United States reached Benjamin Franklin in Paris in late April or early May 1778. Caillé sent the sultan two letters on behalf of Franklin. No action was taken by either the Congress or the Sultan for over two years. After continued delays, the sultan decided to take action to gain the attention of the American leaders in the early fall of 1784.

== Incident ==
Due to the continued delays of the American government in negotiating a treaty with Morocco, Sidi Mohammed issued an order to seize an American ship. On 11 October 1784, the Moroccans captured the Philadelphia merchant ship Betsey after it left Cádiz on its way back to the United States. The ship and crew was captured and taken hostage to Tangier. The sultan announced that he did not confiscate the ship nor cargo nor enslaved the men on board, and that the ship, the cargo, and the men would be released once a treaty was concluded with the United States. The seizure of the ship led to the Americans having to take action and preparing for negotiations with Morocco. The sultan paved the way for a peaceful negotiation climate by releasing the Betsey, its crew, and cargo on July 9, 1785, after Spanish intervention and payment by the United States of ransom of $30,000. The Betsey's capture sent shudders throughout Europe.

== Aftermath ==
The Moroccan–American Treaty of Friendship, also known as the Treaty of Marrakesh, was signed on June 28, 1786. It was the first treaty signed between the United States and any Muslim, Arab, or African country.

== See also ==
- American–Algerian War (1785–1795)
- Barbary Wars
- Dutch–Barbary war
- Barbary corsairs
