= Betsey (1801 ship) =

India-built UK merchant ship 1801–1818

History

United Kingdom
- Name: Betsey
- Owner: Edward Bacon; MacCullum & Co.; D. Isbister & Co.
- Builder: Edward Bacon
- Launched: 22 December 1801, Calcutta, India
- Renamed: Marquis of Wellington, c.1814.
- Fate: Wrecked March 1818 at Margate

General characteristics
- Tons burthen: 630, or 63634/94, or 642, or 653 (bm)
- Length: 124 ft 9 in (38.0 m) (keel)
- Beam: 34 ft 11 in (10.6 m)
- Propulsion: Sail
- Complement: 53
- Armament: 12 guns

Betsey (or Betsy), was launched in 1801, at Calcutta, India. She made one voyage for the British East India Company (EIC) as Betsey. Around 1814, she sailed to England and was sold to English owners who renamed her Marquis of Wellington. As Marquis of Wellington she made a second voyage for the EIC after transporting convicts to New South Wales. She was returning to England in 1818, when she was wrecked near Margate.

== Betsey ==
Edward Bacon (of Hudson & Bacon), Calcutta, in 1801 launched Betsey for his own account. On 10 February 1802, Captain W.W. Bampton (or Brampton) left Calcutta for London with a cargo of rice. Betsey passed Saugor on 10 March, and reached St Helena on 30 June. She arrived at Deptford on 20 September.

On 6 December, Betsey sailed from London to return to the local trade in India.

In 1814, or so her owners sold her and her new owners, in London, named her Marquis of Wellington. She was admitted to the Registry of Great Britain on 6 May 1814. She first appears in Lloyd’s Register in 1814, with owner D. Isbister & Co.

== Marquis of Wellington ==
Marquis of Wellington made one trip for the EIC in which she transported convicts to New South Wales and then carried a cargo back from China to Portsmouth. On this voyage she made the first recorded European contact with Mokil Atoll (Mwoakilloa Atoll).

Under the command of George Betham (or Bitham), she sailed from Portsmouth, England, on 1 September 1814. On 11 November, Marquis of Wellington reached Rio de Janeiro. She then stayed there for some three weeks. Marquis of Wellington arrived at Port Jackson on 27 January 1815.

She had embarked 200 or 199 male convicts, of whom two or one died. Sources agree that 198 landed. A detachment from the 46th Regiment of Foot provided the guard; the regiment was transferring to Australia to replace the 73rd Regiment of Foot (1st Battalion Highlanders).

Marquis of Wellington left Port Jackson on 4 April, bound for China. She sighted Pohnpei, and on 7 May Betham made the first recorded sighting of Mokil (Mwoakilloa Atoll), at 6°4′N 159°48′E., naming it "Wellington Group" after his ship, The name persisted for some years thereafter.

Marquis of Wellington arrived at Whampoa on 4 June. Homeward bound, she crossed the Second Bar on 12 July. She reached Batavia on 5 September, and St Helena on 10 November, before arriving back at Portsmouth on 26 December.

== Fate ==
On 21 November 1817, Lloyd's List reported that Marquis of Wellington, Nichols, master, had arrived at Bengal in a damaged state and been taken into dock. She was expected to be able to take on a cargo in June.

Marquis of Wellington was driven onshore on 4 March 1818, on the Mouse Sand, with the loss of two masts, when she was caught in a gale that also caused difficulties to many other vessels along the coast of England. Five days later she was abandoned as a total wreck. Marquis of Wellington, Nichols, master, had been sailing from Bengal to London. Part of her cargo was gotten off and taken to Whitstable and Margate.
