= Betsey (1768 ship) =

18th century sailing ship

Great Britain
- Name: Betsey
- Owner: The DeWoolf family (1768-1777)
- Builder: Liverpool
- Launched: 1768
- Fate: Sold 1777

Great Britain
- Name: HMS Comet
- Acquired: 1777 by purchase
- Out of service: Paid off in August 1778
- Fate: Sold 15 September 1778

General characteristics
- Tons burthen: 140, or 200, or 250 bm
- Length: Overall: 87 ft (27 m); Keel: 70 ft (21 m)
- Beam: 25 ft (7.6 m)
- Depth of hold: 10 ft (3.0 m)
- Sail plan: Sloop
- Complement: 100
- Armament: 10 or 14 x 4-pounder guns

Betsey was a Guineaman (slave ship), launched at Liverpool in 1768. Between 1768 and 1777, she made eight voyages in the triangular trade, transporting enslaved people from West Africa to the Caribbean. In 1777 the British Royal Navy purchased her at Antigua, named her HMS Comet, and armed her as a sloop-of-war. She sailed to England in 1778, where the Navy sold her.

== Slave ship ==
1st voyage transporting enslaved people (1768–1769): Captain Samuel Conway sailed from Liverpool on 31 May 1768, and returned on 17 March 1769. Betsey had gathered captives at Bonny, and delivered them to Antigua.

2nd voyage transporting enslaved people (1769–1770): Captain Conway sailed from Liverpool on 6 June 1769. Betsey acquired captives at Bonny and delivered 380 to Antigua in 1770. At some point Captain Parkinson replaced Conway. Betsey returned to Liverpool on 27 April 1770.

3rd voyage transporting enslaved people (1770–1771): Captain Conway sailed from Liverpool on 29 June 1770. Betsey embarked 440 slaves at Bonny and arrived at Antigua with 423, for a 4% mortality rate. Betsey returned to Liverpool on 5 April 1771.

4th voyage transporting enslaved people (1771–1772): Captain Conway sailed from Liverpool on 19 May 1771. Betsey acquired her slaves at Bonny and arrived at st Kitts on 9 January 1772 with 400. She had left Liverpool with 35 crew members and had 25 when she arrived at St Kitts. She arrived back at Liverpool on 6 March 1772.

5th voyage transporting enslaved people (1772–1773): Captain Conway sailed from Liverpool on 25 April 1772. She acquired her slaves at Bonny and brought them to Jamaica. She had left Liverpool with 32 crew members and she had 25 when she arrived at Jamaica. At some point Captain William Stephenson replaced Conway. Betsey left Jamaica on 8 March 1773 and arrived back at Liverpool on 15 May. In all, she had suffered eight crew deaths on her voyage.

6th voyage transporting enslaved people (1773–1774): Captain John Washington sailed from Liverpool on 15 June 1773. Betsey acquired her slaves at Bonny and delivered them to Jamaica. She had left Liverpool with 41 crew members and arrived with 33. She sailed from Jamaica on 12 April and arrived back at Liverpool on 2 June. In all, she had suffered eight crew deaths on her voyage.

7th voyage transporting enslaved people (1773–1774): Captain Jere Limeburner sailed from Liverpool on 17 July 1774. She acquired her slaves at Bonny and brought them to Jamaica. She returned to Liverpool on 8 July 1775. She had left Liverpool with 41 crew members and she suffered eight crew deaths on her voyage.

The 1776 issue of Lloyd's Register is the first issue available online that lists Betsey. It showed her trade as Liverpool-Africa, and her master changing from Limeburner to Simmons. It also recorded that in 1774 she had damages repaired.

8th voyage transporting enslaved people (1776–1777): Captain John Simmons sailed from Liverpool on 12 June 1776. Betsey arrived in Dominica in 1777 from New Calabar. She had embarked 336 captives and disembarked 272, for a 19% mortality rate.

== HMS Comet ==
Vice-admiral James Young purchased the Guineaman Betsey at Antigua for £1500, and renamed her Comet. On 30 May 1777 he appointed Lieutenant William Swinney (or Swiney), First Lieutenant of Portland, to command Comet.

On 19 March 1778 Lieutenant William Peacock, First Lieutenant of Portland, replaced Swinney, who transferred to Cygnet to replace her previous commander, Lieutenant Robert Stratford, who had died.

In April Young sent Shark and Comet back to England as escorts to a convoy that also included Yarmouth, which Young was sending back for repairs following her engagement with the American privateer Randolph.

== Fate ==
Comet was paid off in August 1778. The navy sold Comet on 15 September 1778.
