= Betsey (1801 Poole ship) =

History

United Kingdom
- Name: Betsey
- Builder: Poole
- Launched: 1801
- Fate: Wrecked February 1807

General characteristics
- Tons burthen: 276 (bm)
- Complement: 35
- Armament: 18 × 6-pounder gns

Betsey was launched at Pool in 1801. She made two voyages as a slave ship in the triangular trade in enslaved people. French privateers captured her on the second voyage but the British Royal Navy recaptured her. Afterwards she was briefly a West Indiaman. She was wrecked in February 1807.

== Career ==
1st voyage transporting enslaved people (1802–1803): Captain John McLean (or McLain) sailed from London on 24 February 1802. In 1802, 155 vessels sailed from English ports, bound for Africa to acquire and transport enslaved people; 30 of these vessels sailed from London.

Betsey arrived at Kingston, Jamaica on 27 September 1802 with 273 captives. She arrived back at London on 3 February 1803.

Year	Master	Owner	Trade	Source
1804	McLean	R.Miles; Lumley	London–Africa	LR

2nd voyage transporting enslaved people (1804): Captain James MacDonald acquired a letter of marque on 5 July 1804. Ten days later he sailed for the Gold Coast, probably from London. In 1804, 147 vessels sailed from English ports, bound for Africa to acquire and transport enslaved people; 18 of these vessels sailed from London.

On 22 February 1805, Betsey, M'Donald, master, was off Surinam when the French privateer Eagle captured her. HMS Beaulieu recaptured Betsey.

By another account, Betsey joined up with Somerset, Neil, master, and Jason, Martin, master, on 20 February some 40 miles off the Surinam river. (Note: Somerset, of 141 tons (bm), had been launched in 1795 at Bridgwater. Jason does not appear in Lloyd's Register.) Somerset and Jason had sailed together from Madeira for mutual protection. Shortly after they came together, two French privateers came up, Fillebustiere, of fourteen 6 and 9-pounder guns and 100 men, and Aigle, of sixteen 9 and 12-pounder guns and 160 men. After an action of about an hour and a half, Betsey struck to Fillebustiere and Jason and Somerset struck to Aigle. Aigle then started to escort the prizes to Guadaloupe. While they were on their way, they encountered Beaulieu, which recaptured Betsey and Somerset and took them into Barbados, where the arrived on 3 March. Readily accessible records make no mention of the disposition of the captives on Betsey

Year	Master	Owner	Trade	Source
1805	M'Donald; W.Auld	Lumley; Dennison	London–Africa	LR
1806	W.Auld; J.Fleck	Denniston	London–Africa	LR
1807	J.Fleck	Denniston	Greenock–St Lucia	LR

== Fate ==
Betsy, Fleck, master, was reported in February 1807 to have wrecked near Londonderry while on a voyage from the West Indies to the Clyde.
