= Betsy (1793 ship) =

History

Great Britain
- Name: Betsy (or Betsey)
- Owner: Gill; 1797:E. Cobham; 1799:J. Potts; 1803:Horncastle
- Builder: Lancaster
- Launched: 1793
- Fate: Wrecked c.October 1803

General characteristics
- Tons burthen: 206, or 208, or 220 (bm)
- Propulsion: Sail
- Armament: 14 × 6-pounder guns

Betsy (or Betsey) was launched at Lancaster in 1793 as a West Indiaman. In 1801 she made one voyage for the British East India Company (EIC) to bring back rice at the behest of the British government. On her return she became a Baltic trader. She was lost in 1803.

== Career ==
Betsy entered Lloyd's Register (LR) in 1793 with Gill, master, Cobham, owner, and trade: Lancaster—Dominica. By 1797 Betsey was sailing out of Liverpool for Martinique. Betsy is missing from Lloyd's Register in 1798, but she reappeared in 1799 with W. Elliot, master, J. Potts, owner, and trade: Lancaster—Tortola.

Lloyd's Register for 1800 showed C. Hooper replacing W. Elliot as master, and her trade changing from London—Tortola to London—India. Her owners had tendered her to the EIC to bring back rice from Bengal. She was one of 28 vessels that sailed on that mission between December 1800 and February 1801.

On 24 January 1801, Captain Charles Hooper sailed from Falmouth, bound for India. Betsy was at the Cape of Good Hope on 19 April, and arrived at Calcutta on 7 July. Homeward bound, she left Kedgeree on 19 September, reached Saint Helena on 31 December, and arrived at Gravesend on 12 March 1803.

The 1802 Lloyd's Register shows Betsy's master changing from Hooper to G. Talby, and her trade from London—India to London—Jamaica. the 1803 Lloyd's Register showed her trade changing from London—Jamaica to London—Baltic. Betsy is no longer listed in the 1804 volume.

== Loss ==
However, the Register of Shipping for 1804 showed her with a new owner, Horncastle, and her trade as London—Petersburg. It also bore the annotation "Lost".

Betsey was wrecked in the Gulf of Finland whilst on a voyage from London to Saint Petersburg, Russia. Lloyd's List reported on 11 October 1803 that Betsey, Talby, master, had been lost near Revel while sailing from Petersburg to London.
