= Betsey (1787 ship) =

History

Great Britain
- Name: Betsey
- Owner: 1792: Henry K. and Robert Hunter; 1793:Henry McKeowen and Robert Hunter
- Launched: 1787, Newfoundland
- Captured: 10 August 1793

General characteristics
- Tons burthen: 180, or 194 (bm)
- Complement: 24–27
- Armament: 4 guns

Betsey was launched in 1787 at Newfoundland. She sailed to England and initially she traded between Bristol and the Mediterranean. In 1792 she made one complete voyage as a slave ship in the triangular trade in enslaved people before a French privateer captured her on her second slave voyage after she had embarked captives in West Africa and was bringing them to Jamaica.

== Career ==
Missing issues resulted in Betsey first appearing in Lloyd's Register (LR) in the issue for 1789.

Year	Master	Owner	Trade	Source & notes
1790	H.de Jersey; J.Richards	Mulloney; Hunter & Co.	Newfoundland–Bristol; Bristol–Venice	
1792	J. Richards; J. Spencer	Hunter & Co.	Bristol–Straits; Bristol–Africa	LR; repairs 1792

Captain John Spencer sailed from Bristol on 19 March 1792. Betsey acquired her captives at Bonny. She embarked 248 and arrived at Grenada on 31 August with 226, for a 9% mortality rate. She had left Bristol with 24 crew members and she had 22 when she arrived in Grenada, two having died on the voyage; she discharged eight crewmen in Grenada. She left Grenada on 15 September and arrived back at Bristol on 8 November. By the time Betsey arrived back at Bristol she had suffered a total of three deaths among her crew.

Captain Spencer sailed from Bristol on 19 January 1793.

== Loss ==
In December 1793 Lloyd's List reported that a French privateer had captured Betsey, Spencer, master, as Betsey was sailing from Africa to Jamaica. The privateer sent Betsey into Saint Domingo. The vessel with 283 captives arrived at in Jacmel in August. The privateer had captured her off Puerto Rico on 10 August.

In 1793, 17 British slave ships were lost; nine were lost on the Middle Passage, sailing from Africa to the West Indies. During the period 1793 to 1807, war, rather than maritime hazards or resistance by the captives, was the greatest cause of vessel losses among British slave vessels.
