= Betsey (1803 ship) =

Ship abandoned off coast of New Zealand in 1815

History

India
- Owner: James Underwood
- Builder: Built at Chittagong, India; registered at Calcutta by Hogur & Co.
- Launched: 1803
- Fate: Abandoned, 1815

General characteristics
- Tons burthen: 222, or 280 (bm)

Betsey was a ship that was launched at Chittagong in 1803. She was abandoned off the coast of New Zealand in 1815.

== Loss ==
On 28 December 1814 Betsey, under the command of Philip Goodenough, left Sydney for Macquarie Island, where she arrived on 13 February 1815. Goodenough landed a sealing party of thirteen men and then headed north to the Auckland Islands to undertake further sealing. Contrary winds meant that Betsey was unable to return either to Macquarie Island or to Sydney. Food and water began to run out and the crew started to suffer from scurvy. Heavy winds drove her towards New Zealand and on 18 September heavy seas smashed Betsey's rudder. Twenty miles from the Bay of Islands, with several of his crew dead from scurvy and the remaining crew starving and parched from lack of water, Goodenough ordered the ship abandoned. Fourteen Europeans and six lascars had left Macquarie Island. At the time of abandonment only twelve men were alive. Goodenough placed four in the jollyboat as they were so sick they could not crew a boat; the remainder took to the whaleboat, which towed the jollyboat. Goodenough then headed for New Zealand. Progress was very slow, and soon after abandoning Betsey, Goodenough ordered the rope between the jollyboat and the whaleboat to be cut. The four sick sailors were never seen again. Eventually Goodenough made land and shortly after landing a lascar died; Goodenough died shortly thereafter, on 1 November 1815.

Māori captured the six survivors, whom they eventually released to the brig Active on 23 February 1816.

Betsey itself was eventually blown ashore near Great Exhibition Bay and went to pieces.

== Origins ==
Betsey was owned by James Underwood, but beyond that her origins are somewhat ambiguous.

One source states that she was of some 222 tons, had been built at Chittagong, India, and registered at Calcutta by Hogur & Co. An earlier source has the only Betsey being built at Chittagong being launched in 1803, of 280 tons, and being lost in the Derwent, in New South Wales.
