= Lalla Fatima bint Suleiman =

Lalla Fatima bint Suleiman للا فاطمة بنت سليمان
- Born: Lalla Fatima bint Suleiman al-Alaoui
- Spouse: Sidi Mohammed III (m. circa 1740 - died 1790)
- Issue: Moulay Mohammed Ali; Moulay Abdelmalik; Moulay El Mamoun; Sultan Moulay Hisham; Lalla Sofia; Lalla Lubabah; Lalla Sitt'al'Mulk; Moulay Abdeselam
- House: Alaouite
- Father: Prince Moulay Suleiman al-Alaoui
- Religion: Islam

Princess Lalla Fatima bint Suleiman (Arabic: للا فاطمة بنت سليمان), was an XVIIIth century Alawi Princess. She was one of the wives of Sultan Mohammed ben Abdallah (r. 1757–1790), and the mother of Sultan Moulay Hisham (r. 1792 – 1797).

== Life ==
Princess Lalla Fatima was born to Moulay Suleiman, who is either a son of Moulay Ismail or a son of Moulay Rachid. Her mother's identity is not recorded. In the 1740s she married her cousin the then prince Sidi Mohammed ben Abdallah, she was his first wife. During his reign she was known as Mulat'ud'Dar (The Lady of the House). By her high birth and personal merit she enjoyed a very high ascendancy over the mind of Sidi Mohammed III and was one of his favorite wives. This ensured her also the attachment and veneration of the people, she having with the outmost prudence attended to the government of Morocco, when the monarch was absent.

She intervened before Infanta Luisa of Spain for the release of two Moroccan women galley prisoners in Spain in exchange for Christian female captives imprisoned in Morocco. The two royal women were friends and had already conversed in the past. William Lempriere who met Lalla Fatima in 1789 for a medical consultation upon her request, described her as a perfect Moorish beauty. With round and prominent cheeks blushed in deep red, small black eyes and a face completely guiltless of expression. During her consultation she requested him to be seated close by her side and to feel her pulse as she complained of a slight cold.

The regret of the empire, at her death, was equal to her merit and her virtues, she was widowed of her husband and died after him.

== Descendance ==
Lalla Fatima and Sultan Sidi Mohammed ben Abdallah had several children:

- Moulay Mohammed Ali, the eldest and heir apparent until his death c. 1784 before his father the Sultan;
- Moulay Abdelmalik;
- Moulay El Mamoun (or Maimun), he married Lalla Fatima (last name withheld). In Marrakech, Asrat al Mamounia was offered as a wedding privilege to him and his wife. In this garden the famous La Mamounia hotel named after Mamoun was built at the beginning of the 20th century. He is the father of Princess Lalla Safiya, the mother of Sultan Moulay Hassan I;
- Sultan Moulay Hisham (1748-1799), father of Sultan Abd al-Rahman bin Hisham;
- Lalla Sofia;
- Lalla Lubabah, in 1768 she married Surur ibn Musa'id, Sharif and Emir of Mecca from 1773 to 1788;
- Lalla Sitt’al’Mulk;
- Moulay Abdeselam, he was renowned as a poet and philosopher. In Marrakesh, his father offered him a property located in a green area between the royal kasbah and the medina. Today this property survives as a public park named Asrat Abdeselam. In 1793, accompanied by his daughter Lalla Amina and his wives, he began a journey to Portugal then under the reign of Queen Maria I. The Atlantic journey proved perilous, several stopovers in the Portuguese Atlantic islands were required which delayed their arrival on the continent. Moulay Abdelslam's boat docked in Portugal before that of his daughter and his wives, which arrived a little later on June 13 at the port of Cascais. One of his wives perished during this trip (the mother-in-law of Lalla Amina), their boat having seriously suffered from bad weather.
