= Siege of Ceuta (1790–1791) =

Siege in the 1790 Spanish-Moroccan War

Coordinates: 35°53′18″N 5°18′56″W

- Part of the Hispano-Moroccan War (1790–1791) and Spanish-Moroccan conflicts
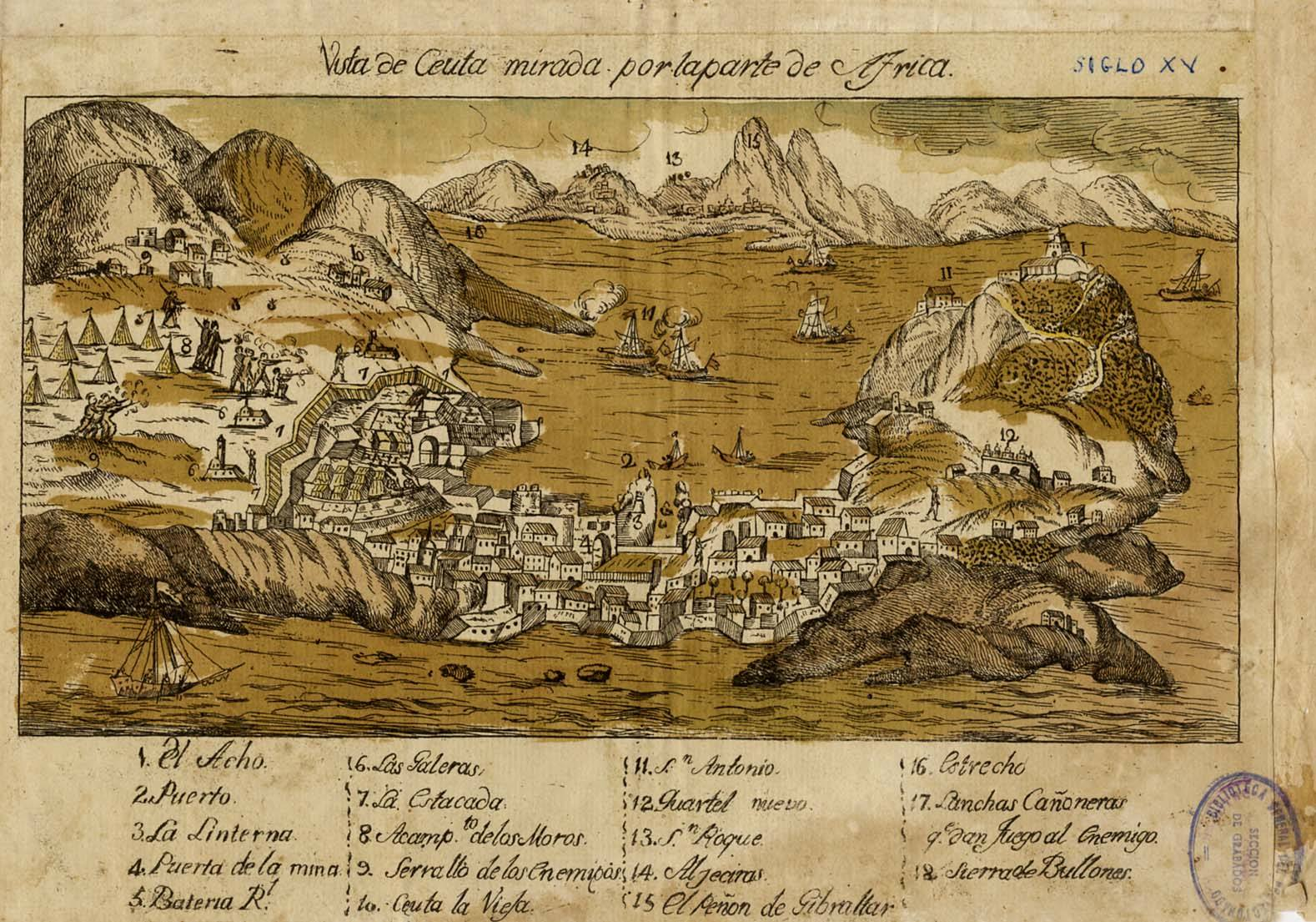
- View of Ceuta during the siege.
| Date | 25 September 1790 – 14 September 1791 |
| Location | Ceuta, Spain |
| Result | Spanish victory |

Belligerents
| Kingdom of Spain | Sultanate of Morocco |

Commanders and leaders
| (Spain) Don Luis de Urbina (Spain) Don José de Urrutia | (Morocco) Moulay al-Yazid (Morocco) Sidi Cherif Ali |

Strength
| 12,000 | 18,000 – 20,000 |

Casualties and losses
| 253 dead | 2,000 dead |

The siege of Ceuta (1790–1791) was an armed confrontation between the Kingdom of Spain and the Sultanate of Morocco during the Spanish-Moroccan War of 1790–1791. The siege of this city was the central episode of this conflict.

== Siege ==
On September 25, the Moroccan army began to bombard the city. Since a sea attack was impossible, the bombardment's objective was to open a breach somewhere in the walls of the city and penetrate through it. The besiegers established their headquarters in the city's seraglio and installed 14 batteries. However, from the start the bombardment was not continuous since there were ongoing peace negotiations between the two countries.

During the siege, Spanish forces relocated towards Ceuta to reinforce the situation there. Most of these regiments arrived in 1791 between a ceasefire and return to hostilities. The naval forces were also present in Ceuta, providing continuous communication between Ceuta and Peninsular Spain; the gunboats invented by Antonio Barceló were particularly effective.

The meetings between Spanish and Moroccan representatives alternated with military confrontations until October 14, 1790, when a ceasefire was established.

Sultan al-Yazid of Morocco proposed the suspension of hostilities to negotiate with the Spanish government in Madrid. The ceasefire would last from October 1790 to August 15, 1791. During these negotiations, the two countries took advantage of the ceasefire to resupply their troops and increase their forces. The Moroccan sultan tried to achieve the surrender of Ceuta and some minor garrisons, or a monetary payment in exchange for peace. King Charles IV refused these terms and formally declared war on Morocco, restarting the conflict on August 15, 1791.

The besieged noticed that the batteries were not guarded by a large garrison while the city was not being bombarded and organized a breakout on August 25. The offensive was carried out in conjunction with the navy, which escorted land forces that left the city to cause massive damage to the Moroccan batteries. In response, the Moroccans launched a major offensive against the city's walls on August 30, when 8,000 men accompanied by the siege batteries attempted unsuccessfully to enter the city.

== Aftermath ==
On September 14, following the directives of the Sultan, Sharif Ali asked to negotiate with the governor of Ceuta as he faced low morale within his ranks. In addition to demoralization, he faced a massive economic cost associated with the siege, and an uprising by the Sultan's brothers who disputed the throne. The Moroccan troops began to retreat in the next days and the city was no longer under bombardment. However, a large part of the artillery in position was not withdrawn. Facing this refusal to withdraw them, the Spanish left twice during September and October, causing skirmishes and casualties on both sides. The skirmishes around the areas used by the besiegers would continue until the signing of a peace treaty. The passionate theme of jihad lost its mobilizing effect when the siege was abandoned at the end of 1791.

== Bibliography ==
- Carmona Portillo, Antonio (2004). Las relaciones hispano-marroquíes a finales del siglo XVIII y el cerco de Ceuta de 1790-1791 (in Spanish). Málaga, Spain: Editorial Sarriá. ISBN 84-95129-90-6.
- Loureiro Souto, Jorge Luis (2015). Los conflictos por Ceuta y Melilla: 600 años de controversias (PDF) (PhD) (in Spanish). Universidad Nacional de Educación a Distancia.
- El Mansour, Mohamed (1990). Morocco in the Reign of Mawlay Sulayman. Middle East & North African Studies Press. ISBN 978-0-906559-32-1.
