= Slimane of Morocco =

Sultan of Morocco (1766–1822)

Sulayman bin Mohammed سليمان بن محمد
- Amir al-Mu'minin
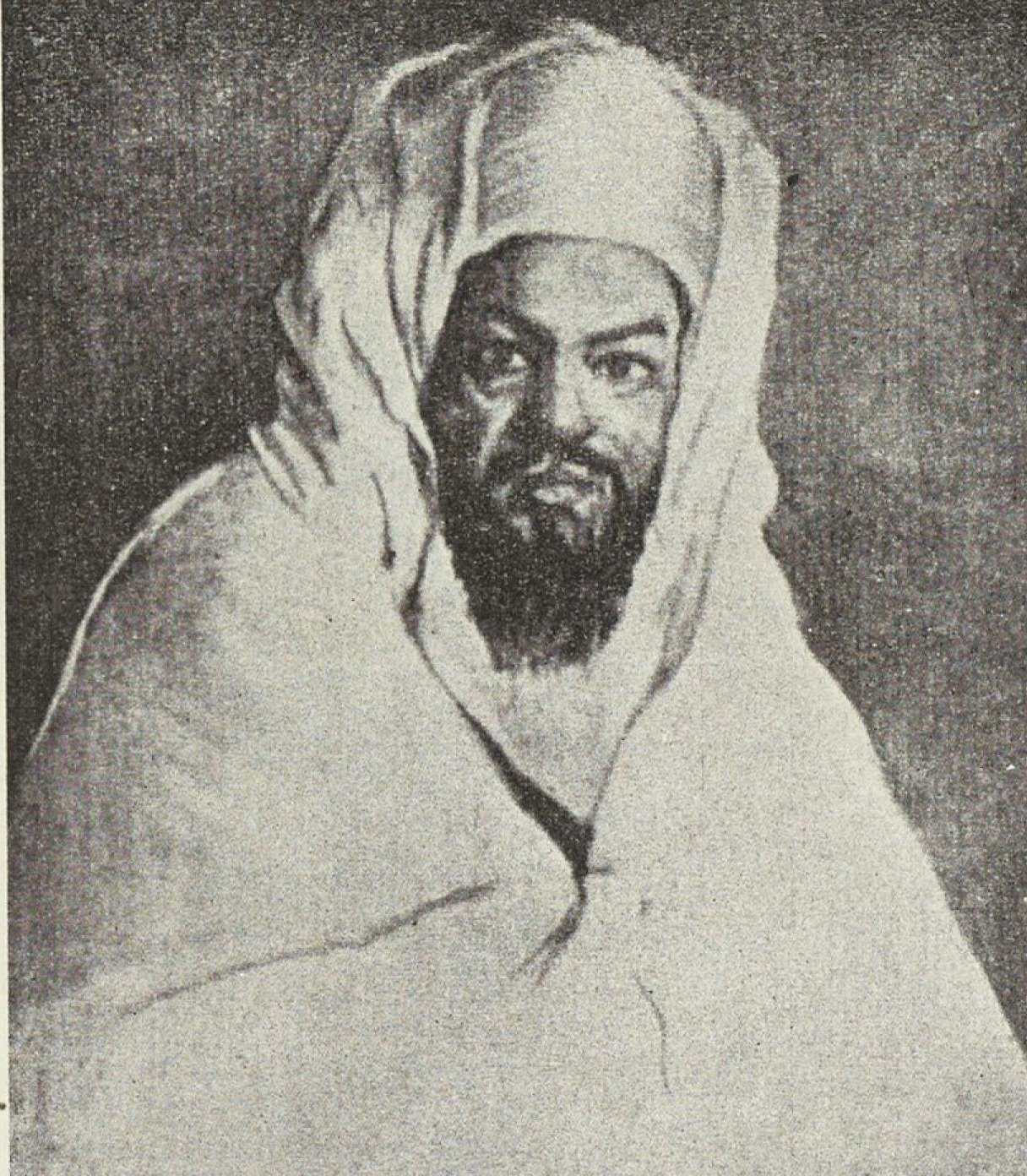
- A portrait of Slimane.

Sultan of Morocco
- Reign: 1792–1822
- Predecessor: al-Yazid bin Mohammed
- Successor: Abd al-Rahman bin Hisham
- Born: 28 June 1766; Tafilalt, Morocco
- Died: 28 November 1822 (aged 56); Marrakesh, Morocco
- Consort: Aisha bint Sheikh Reid of Sirte
- House: House of 'Alawi سُلَاَلَةُ الْعَلَوِيِّينَ الْفِيلَالِيِّينَ
- Father: Mohammed bin Abdallah
- Religion: Sunni Islam (Wahhabism)

Moulay Slimane ben Mohammed (Note: Arabic: أبُو الرَّبيع مولاي سليمان بن محمَّد, romanized: Abu ’l-Rabīʿ Mawlāy Sulaymān ibn Muḥammad, in Moroccan Arabic his name is pronounced as Mūlāy Slīmān), born on 28 June 1766 in Tafilalt and died on 28 November 1822 in Marrakesh, was a Sultan of Morocco from 1792 to 1822, as a ruler of the 'Alawi dynasty. He was proclaimed sultan after the death of his half-brother al-Yazid. Sulayman continued his father's centralization and expansion of the kingdom, and most notably ended the piracy that had long operated from Morocco's coast. As part of Morocco's long running conflict with Spain and Portugal, Sulayman halted all trade with Europe. However, he continued his father's policies of close relations with the United States. He was also a follower of Wahhabism.

== Early life ==
Mawlay Sulayman was born in Tafilalt on 28 June 1766 to Sidi Mohammed III and one of his wives a lady of the Ahlaf tribe. His father Sidi Mohammed took significant care in his religious education, thus Sulayman memorised the Qur'an in a Zawiya in Safi and studied the biography of Muhammad in Ksar al-Kabir. Sulayman went to Tafilalt in 1783 with two of his brothers where they were given private tutors, there he had the most exceptional 'Ulama of Fes, such as Abd al-Qadir bin Shaqrun and Hamdun bin al-Hajj. He went to Fes in 1790, and in March 1792, he was offered the throne by the people of Fes. Sulayman accepted, however he accepted only upon the condition that he would not take part in fighting his brothers in the ongoing civil war, despite him being little prepared to govern a kingdom. He had great respect for the Shari'a.

== Reign ==
=== Early reign ===
Once Mawlay al-Yazid died in Marrakesh on 17 February 1792, the struggle for power began between the sons of Mohammed III. There was Mawlay Hisham who ruled in Marrakesh, and Mawlay Maslama who ruled in the north. Mawlay Sulayman emerged successful in 1795, however there was still plenty of resistance which he had to pacify, mainly the Berber tribes of the mountains, and the tariqas. Immediately after this, in 1798, the sultan sent a military expedition to Oujda, which had been controlled by the Ottomans since 1792 during the unrest in Morocco. The sultan encountered no difficulty in recovering Oujda and the eastern provinces from the Turks and set the new border at Wadi Kiss. In 1800, the inhabitants of Tuat agreed to pay taxes to the sultan, extending the authority of the Makhzen southwards and allowing the sultan to increase his revenue. Mawlay Sulayman's reign was difficult and chaotic because of the hostilities between tribes that he was unable to appease, with a strong divide between the Arabs and Berbers, as demonstrated by the two major revolts that marked his reign. In Marrakesh, he rebuilt the Ali bin Yusef Mosque, without leaving the slightest trace of its original Almoravid or Almohad design which dated from the early 12th century, completing its construction by 1819 or 1820.

=== Commercial policy ===
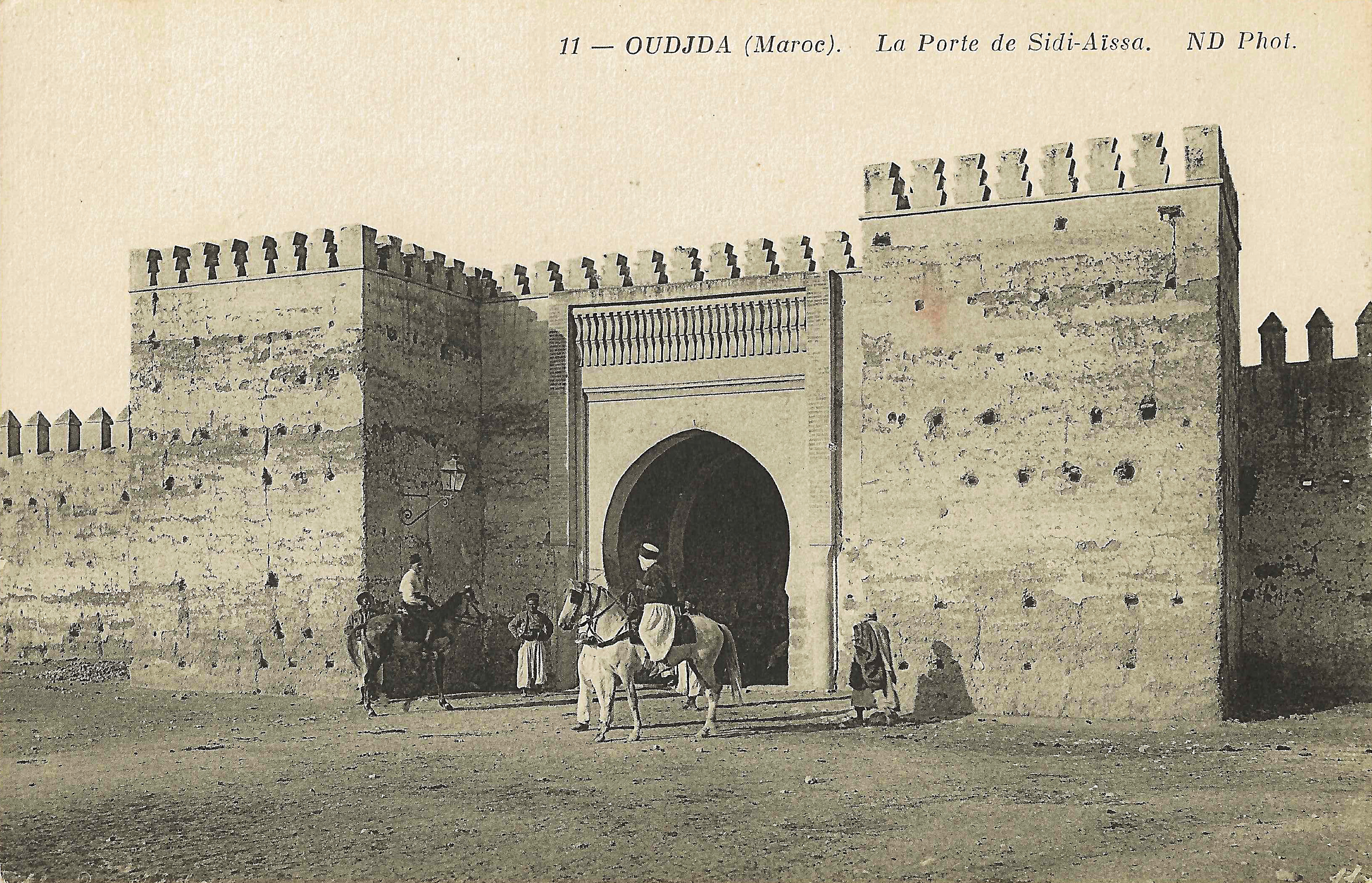
Oujda in 1922

Once news of the French invasion of Egypt and Syria in 1798 reached Morocco with reports of French soldiers looting, killing, and abusing the Egyptian people, Mawlay Sulayman responded by reversing the overseas trade policy of his father, Muhammad III. Commercial ties with Europe were reduced and foreign businessmen were encouraged to leave Morocco. After this, the sultan turned to the Moroccan heartland, extracting from tribes the traditional Qur'anic taxes, Zakat and 'Ushr. This policy worked for some time, but after 1817, a series of natural disasters destroyed crops, leading to rebellions. Mawlay Sulayman presented the United States with a two-storey mud and stone building in Tangier in 1821, the country's first acquired property. It would house the American Legation and Consulate for 140 years. During the Tripolitan War between the United States and Tripolitania, Morocco declared war on the United States in June 1802, however peace was restored in September 1803 when Edward Preble met Mawlay Sulayman in Tangier and signed a peace treaty.

=== Decline of authority ===
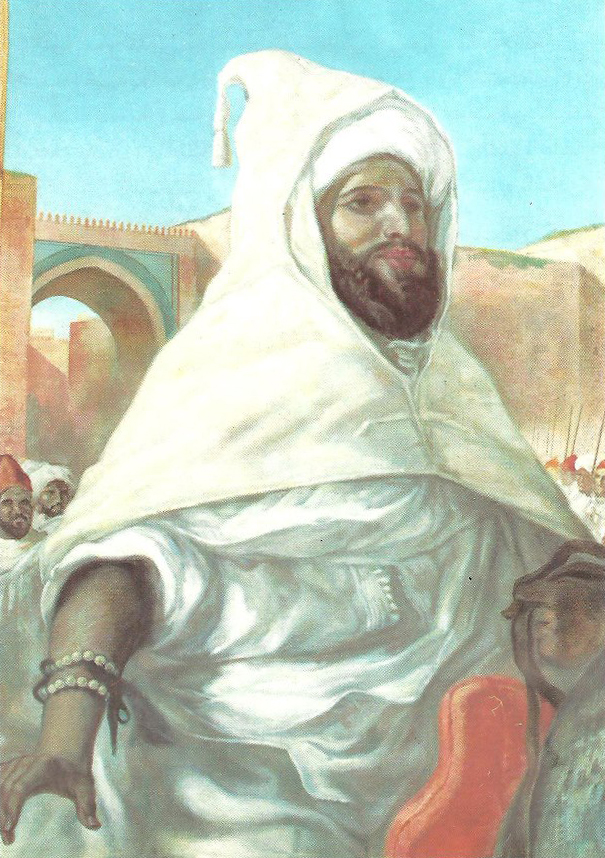
Mawlay Sulayman's successor, Mawlay Abd al-Rahman bin Hisham.

In the spring of 1819, during an epidemic of plague, the sultan decided to lead a major expedition against the Ait Umalu tribe as advised by Muhammad bin al-Ghazi, leader of the Zemur tribe. The army was assembled in Tadla and was made up of Haouz tribes, a northern army, tribes of the Azghar, the Udaya, and the 'Abid al-Bukhari. The number of Makhzen troops assembled in Tadla amounted to 60,000 men, and in May 1819, Mawlay Sulayman headed to the Adekhsan where the Ait Umalu were raided, and the two sides engaged in a battle soon after. The battle was intense, however on the second day of the battle, Muhammad bin al-Ghazi abandoned the sultan and joined the Ait Umalu. The Makhzen troops were overwhelmed between the mountain and lowland rebels, and all tribal contingents deserted the sultan, who was left with the Udaya and 'Abid al-Bukhari. By the end of the battle, the Makhzen armies were routed. Mawlay Ibrahim was wounded, and Mawlay Sulayman himself was imprisoned. However, the sultan was shown every respect as he was a Sharif (direct descendant of Muhammad), and was released three days later.

This was followed by a rebellion in Fes in 1820, and Ibrahim bin Yazid proclaimed himself sultan there. From March 1821 to April 1822, Mawlay Sulayman turned his attention to suppressing the rebellions in Fes and Tetuan, sending an army of 15,000 men to Tetuan. The sieges lasted for about a year, and in the spring of 1821, the rebels suffered a major defeat at the hands of the Makhzen troops, and in July, the troops of the sultan inflicted heavy losses on the Ait Umalu. Subsequently, Mawlay Sulayman headed north to inspect the forces besieging Tetuan and spent most of the winter directing military operations from Tangier. Despite receiving a reinforcement of 3,000 men from Dukkala who were mobilised by his nephew Mawlay Abd al-Rahman, the sultan failed to break the resistance of Tetuan, but succeeded in capturing the fortress of Martil in January 1822. Mawlay Sulayman decided to break the siege and return to besieging Fes. Throughout the next month, Mawlay Sulayman pacified the regions north and east of Fes, and following the long siege of Fes, the people of the city opened the gates to the sultan who entered the city on 20 April 1822, and the people of Tetuan did the same soon after on 3 May 1822.

After this, he was himself defeated near Marrakesh in 1822 and had little power left. Mawlay Sulayman entrusted the Ulama of Fes to proclaim his nephew Abd al-Rahman as the new Sultan once he died. Mawlay Sulayman died on 28 November 1822 and was succeeded by Abd al-Rahman bin Hisham.

== Religious policy ==
During the reign of Mawlay Sulayman, the Wahhabi movement founded by Muhammad bin Abd al-Wahhab in the Arabian Peninsula reached Morocco. Saudi Imam of the Emirate of Diriyah, Saud bin Abdulaziz Al Saud, decided to send messages to all the rulers of the Arab Islamic countries, to Iraq, Egypt, the Levant and the Maghreb, explaining the goals of his call, and his letter reached Mawlay Sulayman in 1811. Mawlay Sulayman was inspired by this Islamic revivalist movement and used his authority to condemn the use of music and dance in religious ceremonies, and banning pilgrimages to saintly shrines and religious festivals, even having the qubba over his father's grave removed in 1812, arguing that it was excessive ornamentation.

Mawlay Sulayman clearly opposed venerating the Muslim saints (ʾawliyāʾ ), and in 1805, he ordered the removal of a mausoleum in Rabat, where his father was buried, leaving only the grave. In 1806, he wrote a treatise criticising Sufi practices, which could not be greeted enthusiastically in Morocco where Islam was steeped in Maraboutism. During the reigns of Mawlay Sulayman’s successors, such influences were absent, and the veneration of “saints” was openly opposed only by Mawlay Hassan I bin Mohammed (1873–1894).

=== Theological work ===
"An-Nâsiri said: The Sultan Al moulay Souleymân (ie Moulay Slimane), may Allah bless him, shared this point of view, which is why he wrote his book talking about the Sufis in which he warned against those who refute the Sunnah and support the innovation, as he explained the manner of visiting the Awliya (virtuous) and warned against the exaggeration of the lower people on it, and gave advice to the Muslims.

He also says that Al-Mawlâ Souleymân had written a sermon urging the oneness of Allah and condemning the innovations, and that he ordered it to be distributed in all the Friday mosques, and ordered the closing of the prayer corners Sufis."

Professor Mohammad Kamal Joumouah notes from the Islamic Encyclopedia that Al-Mawlâ Souleymân had been very concerned after the year 1810 with Wahhabism or the Salafi call held by Sheikh Mohammad ibn Abdil-Wahhâb, which made tough positions against the Sufis.

== See also ==
- 'Alawi dynasty
- List of sultans of Morocco
- History of Morocco
- Tripolitan War

== Bibliography ==
- El Mansour, Mohamed (1990). Morocco in the Reign of Mawlay Sulayman. Middle East & North African Studies Press. ISBN 9780906559321.
- Miller, Susan Gilson (2013). A History of Modern Morocco. Cambridge University Press. ISBN 9780521810708.
- Pennell, C. R. (2009). Morocco: From Empire to Independence. Oneworld Publications. ISBN 9781851686346.

| Preceded by al-Yazid | Sultan of Morocco; 1792–1822 | Succeeded by Abd al-Rahman |
