= Thomas Barclay (diplomat) =

American diplomat (1728–1793)

Consul of the United States for Morocco
- In office May 13, 1791 – January 19, 1793
- Preceded by: Position established
- Succeeded by: Solomon Moore

Personal details
- Born: 1728 Strabane, County Tyrone, Ireland
- Died: January 19, 1793 (aged 64–65) Lisbon, Portugal
- Occupation: Merchant; diplomat

Thomas Barclay (1728 – January 19, 1793) was an American merchant and diplomat. He served as the United States' consul in France (1781–1787) and, during his time as a diplomat, negotiated the United States' first treaty, the Moroccan–American Treaty of Friendship, with the sultan of Morocco in 1786. He was the first American diplomat to die in a foreign country in the service of the United States.

== Early life ==
Barclay was born in Strabane, County Tyrone, Ireland, son of Robert Barclay (d. 1779), prosperous linen merchant and ship owner. His mother's name is unknown, but may have been Carsan. After learning the merchant trade in his father's business in Strabane, he arrived in Philadelphia around 1764 in his mid-thirties. There he was active in the large Irish community, where he was a founding member of the Friendly Sons of St. Patrick (1771), and he became a successful merchant and ship-owner. His firm played a big role in the Irish trade – especially in the export of flax seed and the import of linen and other dry goods. As time passed, the firm's ships were increasingly seen in the ports of England, southern Europe, the Caribbean, and occasionally the Mediterranean.

In 1770 Thomas Barclay married Mary Hoops in Philadelphia. Born in 1750 in western Pennsylvania, Mary had moved to Philadelphia with her family at the age of eleven. She was one of eight children of Adam Hoops (1708–1771) and Elizabeth Finney Hoops (1720–1782).

Thomas Barclay's first decade in Philadelphia was a time of growing friction with England that began with the Stamp Act in 1765 and he was an early member of the resistance. A signer of non-importation agreements in 1765 and 1769, he was on the committee that organized the Philadelphia Tea Party in 1773, which used persuasion rather than violence to refuse the British East India Company's tea. He was one of only four men elected a member of the five successive Philadelphia correspondence committees during the resistance years of 1774–1776. He was also elected to the Philadelphia Corporation in 1774, named a deputy delegate to the Provincial conventions in 1774 and 1775, and appointed to the Pennsylvania Navy Board in 1777. Following the outbreak of war with England and the Declaration of Independence he remained politically active. In 1781, when it became clear that William Palfrey, who had been named consul to France, was lost at sea, the Continental Congress named Barclay to the post.

== Consul in France ==
October 5, 1781, Thomas and Mary Barclay and their three young children embarked on the ship St. James, Captain Thomas Truxtun, and began a battle- and storm-filled voyage to France. There, working with minister Benjamin Franklin during the last years of the war, most of Barclay's time was spent in Dutch and French ports arranging the shipment of blankets, clothing and other supplies for General George Washington's troops. A year after his arrival, the Continental Congress also appointed him commissioner to settle America's public accounts in Europe since 1776. At about the same time he agreed to be the agent in Europe for the Commonwealth of Virginia.

In August 1784 Thomas Barclay welcomed to Paris John Adams, with whom he had worked in Holland, and Thomas Jefferson. They had been sent to negotiate treaties of friendship and commerce with the maritime states of Europe and the Barbary powers of Morocco, Algiers, Tunis and Libya in North Africa. Jefferson succeeded Franklin as minister to France in late spring of 1785, and from that time on Barclay worked closely with him on trade and other matters.

In the fall of 1785 Jefferson proposed sending Thomas Barclay to negotiate a treaty of friendship and commerce with the sultan of Morocco, Sidi Muhammad ibn Abdullah, also known as Muhammad III (reigned 1757–1790). John Adams, who was by then serving as minister in London, agreed: "If Mr. Barclay will undertake the voyage, I am for looking no farther. We cannot find a steadier, or more prudent man." Jefferson and Adams were faced with difficult decisions by threats to American shipping from the Barbary corsairs. In October 1784 an American merchantman had been seized in the south Atlantic by a Moroccan corsair; this, the Moroccan sultan had quickly explained, was to get America to send an envoy to negotiate a treaty with him. He had sought this through diplomatic channels for a number of years with no success.

== First American diplomat in Morocco ==
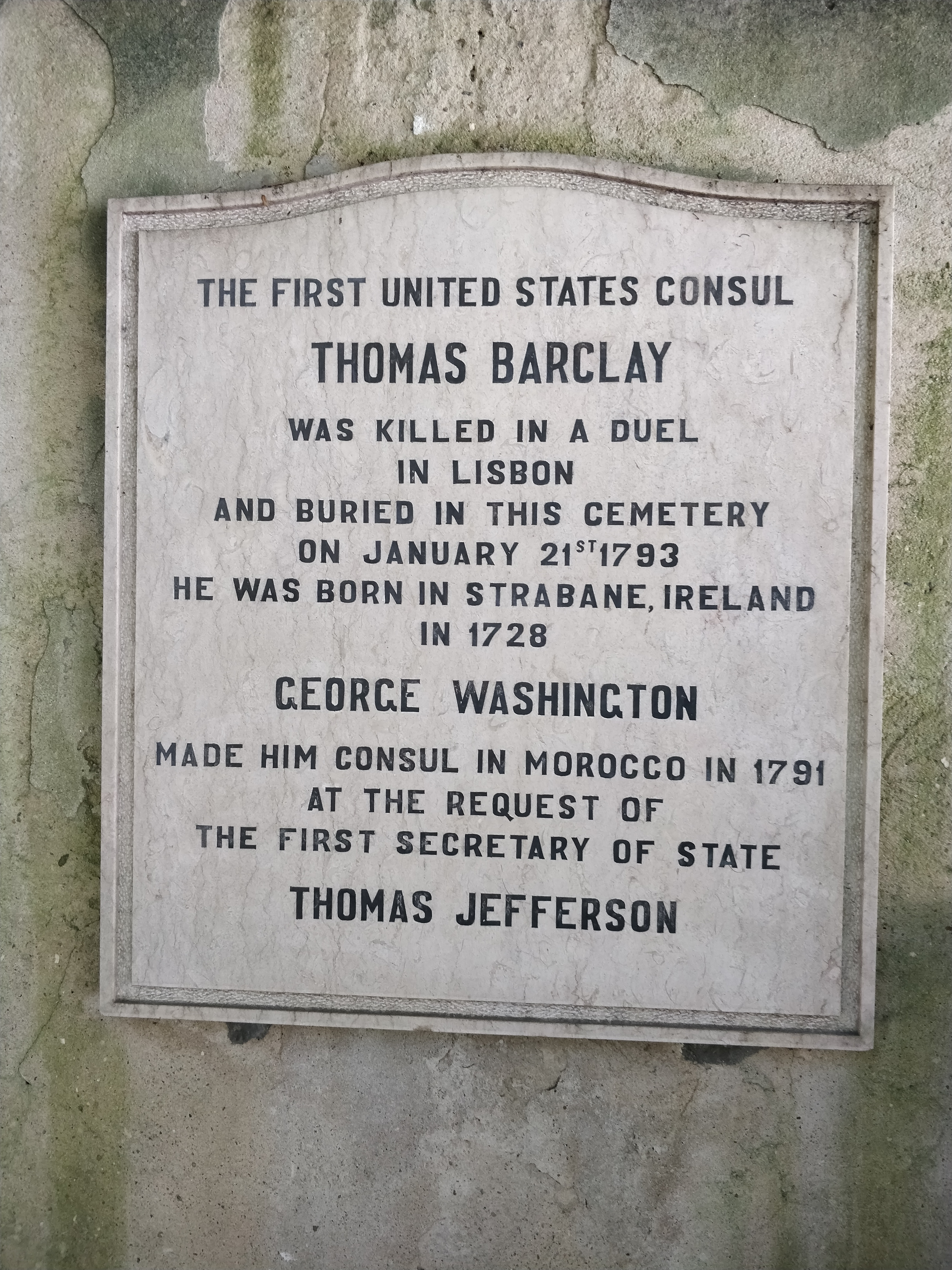
Thomas Barclay's grave at the British Cemetery in Lisbon, Portugal

Thomas Barclay arrived in the Moroccan capital of Marrakesh in June 1786, after five months of overland travel and a sea voyage from Cádiz to the Moroccan port of Mogador. After two audiences with the sultan, the draft treaty he had brought from Paris was accepted with only minor changes. When the question of future presents or tribute was informally raised he made it clear that there could be no question of either, or he would have to leave without a treaty. The matter was dropped and Barclay obtained for America a rare treaty with a North African power without promise of tribute — large annual payments and/or delivery of military or other goods of value. The treaty was ratified by Congress in July 1787. A United States Department of State official observed in 1967 that, "the basic provisions of the 1787 treaty [have] never been broken, making this the longest unbroken treaty relationship in United States history."

The treaty meant that American ship captains no longer needed to fear Moroccan corsairs and that the Atlantic shipping lanes to and from Southern Europe were safe for American ships as long as a Portuguese naval squadron at the strait of Gibraltar kept corsairs from Algiers, Tunis, and Tripoli in the Mediterranean, which it did until long after the United States made peace with Algiers (the principal threat) in 1795 — except for a few disastrous weeks of a truce in 1793 when eleven American ships were seized by Algerine corsairs — at least seven of them in the Atlantic.

In 1791 President George Washington and Secretary of State Jefferson sent Thomas Barclay back to Morocco to reconfirm the US-Morocco treaty with the successor to the late sultan with whom Barclay had negotiated. By the time he reached Gibraltar an internecine battle for the sultanate was underway among the late sultan's sons. He was told to wait, which he did, reporting to Secretary of State Jefferson often and in detail with news from Morocco and other parts of Barbary. In December 1792 he received a letter from President Washington asking him to go to Algiers to ransom Americans being held there and to negotiate a treaty with the ruling dey. (Barclay was the backup to John Paul Jones who had died before receiving the instructions.) He immediately went to Lisbon to obtain funds critical to the mission, but on his third day there he took sick. The following day, January 19, 1793, suffering from what the doctors called an inflammation of the lungs, Thomas Barclay died. According to his headstone, now placed on a wall of the British Cemetery in Lisbon, he "died in a duel".

== Notes and references ==
- Roberts, Priscilla H. and Richard S. Roberts, Thomas Barclay (1728-1793): Consul in France, Diplomat in Barbary. Lehigh University Press. 2008, ISBN 978-0-934223-98-0.
- Marquis Who's Who, Inc. Who Was Who in American History, the Military. Chicago: Marquis Who's Who, 1975. ISBN 0837932017 OCLC 657162692
