= Marthe Franceschini =

Wife of Mohamed ben Abdellah of Morocco (1755–1799)

Marthe Franceschini (1755 - 1799), renamed Lalla Dawiya was a slave concubine and then the wife of Sultan Mohammed ben Abdallah of Morocco (r. 1757–1790).

She was born in Corsica, but Doctor William Lempriere who met her reports that she was an Italian woman native of Genoa. When she was seven, she was kidnapped by corsairs and sold at the slave market in Morocco.

Described as a beauty, she was acquired by Sultan Mohammed ben Abdallah as a slave concubine in his harem. She eventually gained a favorite position in the 'Alawi harem. As such, she converted to Islam and was given the name Lalla Dawiya. In 1786, the sultan made her one of his legal wives. She maintained diplomatic contacts with Europeans rulers such as Napoleon I.

== See also ==
- Helen Gloag
