= Yazid of Morocco =

al-Yazid bin Mohammed الْيَزِيدُ بْن مُحَمَّدٍ

Sultan of Morocco
- Reign: 1790–1792
- Predecessor: Mohammed III
- Successor: Proclamations: Hisham bin Mohammed (in Marrakesh until 1797); Sulayman bin Mohammed (in Fes legitimate ruler)
- Born: 6 May 1750; Fes, Morocco
- Died: 23 February 1792 (aged 41); Near Zagora, Morocco
- Burial: Saadian Tombs, Marrakesh
- House: 'Alawi dynasty
- Father: Mohammed bin Abdallah
- Religion: Sunni Islam

Mawlay al-Yazid bin Mohammed (Arabic: الْيَزِيدُ بْن مُحَمَّدٍ), born on 6 May 1750 in Fes and died on 23 February 1792 near Zagora, was a Sultan of Morocco from 1790 to 1792, a ruler of the 'Alawi dynasty. He was proclaimed sultan after the death of his father Mohammed bin Abdallah.

== Reign ==
Mawlay al-Yazid was born in Fes in 1750. al-Yazid's first order of business was persecuting the Jews of the city of Tétouan. In deference to Yazid's father, Sultan Mohammed ben Abdallah, the Jews of Tétouan denied financial support to Yazid and his effort to overthrow his father. Observers remarked that Yazid authorized his black troops to plunder Tétouan's Jewish quarter. For two years, the country was thrown into turmoil. Mawlay al-Yazid attempted to undo the innovations instituted by his father, dismantling much of his father's system.

== See also ==
- List of sultans of Morocco
- History of Morocco
- 'Alawi dynasty

Preceded by Mohammed III	Sultan of Morocco; 1790–1792	Succeeded by Sulayman
