= G. W. Mordecai =

American politician

Member of the California State Assembly from the 62nd district
- In office January 2, 1893 - January 7, 1895
- Preceded by: Frank T. Murnan
- Succeeded by: Nathan LaFayette Bachman

Member of the California State Assembly from the 70th district
- In office January 5, 1891 - January 2, 1893
- Preceded by: Egbert Harris Tucker
- Succeeded by: Cyrus Mortimer Simpson

Personal details
- Born: April 18, 1844 Rosewood, Virginia, US
- Died: June 14, 1920 (aged 76) Madera County, California, US
- Party: Democratic
- Spouse: Louise Hunter Dixon (m. 1876)
- Children: 4

George Washington Mordecai (April 18, 1844 – June 14, 1920) served in the California State Assembly for the 70th district from 1891 to 1893 and the 62nd district from 1893 to 1895 and during the American Civil War he served in the Army of the Confederate States of America.

== Early life and family ==
Mordecai was born at "Rosewood", his family's farm near Richmond, Virginia, the son of Augustus Mordecai and Rosina Young Mordecai. He was named for his uncle, George Washington Mordecai (1801–1871). His grandfather was educator Jacob Mordecai; his aunts included educators Emma Mordecai and Rachel Mordecai Lazarus, and another uncle, Alfred Mordecai, taught at West Point. One of his first cousins was anarchist Marx Edgeworth Lazarus.

== Career ==
Mordecai served in the Confederate Army from 1862 to 1865. His uncle George, a lawyer and railroad president, helped Mordecai start a large sheep ranch in central California in 1868. He was a member of the California Water & Forest Association.

Mordecai served two terms in the California State Assembly, from 1891 to 1895. One of his actions as a legislator was to create Madera County, by dividing Fresno County, in 1893. He ran unsuccessfully for a seat in the California State Senate. Later in life, he was a member of the Democratic National Committee in 1912, and was a delegate to the Democratic National Conventions in 1916 and 1920.

== Personal life and legacy ==
Mordecai married Mississippi-born Louise Hunter Dixon in 1876; they had four children (George W. Jr., Louise, Brooke, and Ethelfleda). He died in Madera County, California, in 1920, at the age of 76. As of 2020, his ranch is still an active business in Madera County, and he is remembered as a local pioneer.
