= Mordecai (disambiguation) =

Mordecai is one of the main personalities in the Book of Esther in the Hebrew Bible.

Mordecai, Mordechai, Mordicai, or Mordechaj may also refer to:

== People ==
=== Mononym ===
- Kevin Thorn, American professional wrestler who used the ring name "Mordecai"

=== Surname ===
==== Mordecai ====
- Jacob Mordecai (1762–1838), pioneer in education in Colonial America
- Mike Mordecai, major league baseball player
- Moses Cohen Mordecai (1804–1888), American businessman, politician, parnas and owner of the Mordecai Steamship Line
- Leslie R. Mordecai, international commissioner of the Scout Association of Jamaica
- Pamela Mordecai, Jamaican writer, teacher, scholar and poet
- Tanner Mordecai (born c. 2000), American football player
- Mordecai family, Jewish family of Philadelphia, Virginia and North Carolina, 18th–19th centuries

==== Mordechai ====
- Yitzhak Mordechai, former Israeli general and Minister of Defense
- Yoav Mordechai, Israeli Brigadier General

=== Given name ===
==== Mordecai ====
- Mordecai Brown (1876–1948), baseball player nicknamed "Three Finger" or "Miner"
- Mordecai Davidson (1845–1940), professional baseball owner and manager in the late 1880s
- Mordecai Halberstadt (died 1770), German rabbi and grammarian
- Mordecai Kaplan (1881–1983), founder of Reconstructionist Judaism
- Mordecai Lawner (1928–2014), American actor
- Mordecai Lincoln (1771–1830), uncle of Abraham Lincoln
- Mordecai Manuel Noah (1785–1851), Jewish American playwright
- Mordecai Meirowitz (born 1930), inventor of the board game Mastermind
- Mordecai Myers (Georgia politician) (1794–1865), 19th-century American politician and landowner
- Mordecai Myers (New York politician) (1776–1871), American merchant, politician, and military officer
- Mordecai Richler (1931–2001), Canadian author
- Mordecai Roshwald (1921–2015), American science fiction writer
- Mordecai Waxman (1917–2001), American rabbi, responsible for interfaith dialogue with the Vatican

==== Mordicai ====
- Mordicai Gerstein, American children's author

==== Mordechai ====
- Mordechai Anielewicz, Polish commander of Jewish Combat Organization during the Warsaw Ghetto Uprising
- Mordechai Ben David, American musician
- Mordechai ben Hillel or The Mordechai, major Talmudist and posek
- Mordechai Gafni, American philosopher, writer, and former rabbi
- Mordechai Gur (1930–1995), Chief of Staff of the Israel Defense Forces
- Moti Kirschenbaum (born 1939), Israeli journalist, announcer, and TV presenter
- Mordechai Shani, Director General of the Sheba Medical Center and 2009 Israel Prize recipient
- Mordechai Shapiro, American singer
- Mordechai Spiegler (born 1944), Israeli football player and manager
- Mordechai Vanunu, Israeli nuclear technician

==== Mordechaj ====
- Dawid Mordechaj Apfelbaum (died 1943), officer in the Polish Army and a commander of the Jewish Military Union
- Mordechaj Gebirtig (1877–1942), Polish Yiddish poet and songwriter
- Mordechaj Józef Leiner (1801–1854), rabbinic Hasidic thinker and founder of the Izhbitza-Radzyn dynasty of Hasidic Judaism
- Mordechaj Maisel (1528–1601), philanthropist and communal leader in Prague
- Chaim Mordechaj Rumkowski (1877–1944), head of the Jewish Council of Elders in the Łódź Ghetto
- Mordechaj Spektor (1858–1925), Yiddish novelist and editor from the Haskalah period
- Mordechaj Tenenbaum (1916–1943), member of the Jewish Combat Organization (Żydowska Organizacja Bojowa) and leader of the Białystok Ghetto Uprising

== Fiction ==
- Mordecai the blue jay, one of two main characters in the animated television series Regular Show
- Mordecai, a character in Gearbox Software's Borderlands
- Mordecai, a changeling Game Guide character in the book series Dungeon Crawler Carl
- Mordecai Heller, a male feline character in the webcomic Lackadaisy
- Mordechai Jefferson Carver, a character from the film The Hebrew Hammer
- Mordecai Green, fictional lawyer for the poor in John Grisham's The Street Lawyer
- Dr. Mordecai Sahmbi, character from the sci-fi television show Time Trax
- Mordecai, a character in the movie The Cabin in the Woods
- Mordecai, a character in the movie High Plains Drifter
- Rabbi Yohannon ben Mordecai, a character in the novel The Messiah of Septimania by Lee Levin

== Places ==
- Givat Mordechai, a Jewish neighborhood in southwest-central Jerusalem, Israel
- Kfar Mordechai, a village in central Israel
- Mordecai Place Historic District, a neighborhood in downtown Raleigh, North Carolina
- Neot Mordechai, a kibbutz in Israel
- Yad Mordechai, a kibbutz in Israel

== Buildings ==
- Mordecai House (Raleigh, North Carolina), listed on the NRHP in North Carolina
- Mordecai Lincoln House (Springfield, Kentucky), listed on the NRHP in Kentucky
- Mordecai Lincoln House (Lorane, Pennsylvania), listed on the NRHP in Pennsylvania

== Other uses ==
- "Mordecai", a song by Between the Buried and Me from the 2003 album The Silent Circus
- Mordecai, a pet hawk in the film The Royal Tenenbaums
- Mordecai (band), a synth pop group from Portland, Oregon
- Mordechai (album), a 2020 studio album by Khruangbin

== See also ==
- Mortdecai, a 1970s series of novels by Kyril Bonfiglioli
- Mortdecai (film), a 2015 film starring Johnny Depp
