= Moti =

Moti or MOTI may refer to:

== Names ==
- Mordecai (disambiguation), a Hebrew given name, abbreviated Moti
- Motilal (disambiguation), an Indian given name often abbreviated Moti

== People ==
=== Mononym ===
- Moti (DJ) (Timotheus "Timo" Romme, born 1987), Dutch DJ and music producer

=== Surname ===
- Julian Moti (1965–2020), former attorney general of the Solomon Islands
- Cosmin Moți (born 1984), Romanian football player

=== Given name ===
- Moti Almoz, Israeli general
- Moti Bodek (born 1961), Israeli architect
- Moti Chandra, Indian art historian
- Moti Daniel (born 1963), Israeli basketball player
- Moti Elon, Israeli rabbi
- Moti Giladi, Israeli singer and actor
- Moti Gitik, Israeli mathematician
- Moti Heiblum, Israeli electrical engineer and physicist
- Moti Herskowitz, professor of chemical engineering at Ben-Gurion University of the Negev
- Moti Kahana, Israeli-American businessman
- Moti Kirschenbaum, Israeli television presenter
- Moti Kripalani, Indian civil servant
- Moti Lugasi (born 1991), Israeli taekwondo athlete
- Moti Taka, Israeli singer
- Moti Tikaram, Indo-Fijian judge

== Other uses ==
- Ministry of Trade and Industry (Ghana)
- Moti Island, a volcanic island on the western side of Halmahera Island
- Moți people, inhabitants of Romania's Țara Moților
- Mochi, a Japanese rice cake, in Kunrei-shiki/Nihon-shiki spelling
- Moti, meaning "king" in the Oromo language
- Moti, meaning "pearl" in Hindi and Urdu, appearing in some place names, including:
  - Moti Jheel, lake in Kanpur, Uttar Pradesh, India
  - Motilal (disambiguation)
  - Moti Nagar (disambiguation)
  - Moti Mahal (disambiguation)
- Museum of the Islands, a museum in Pine Island Center, Lee County, Florida
- Stedelijk Museum Breda, formerly the Museum of the Image (MOTI), in the Netherlands
