= Nagvasuki Temple =

Hindu temple located in Uttarpradesh, India

Coordinates: 25°27′26″N 81°53′04″E

Nagvasuki Mandir
- नागवासुकी मंदिर
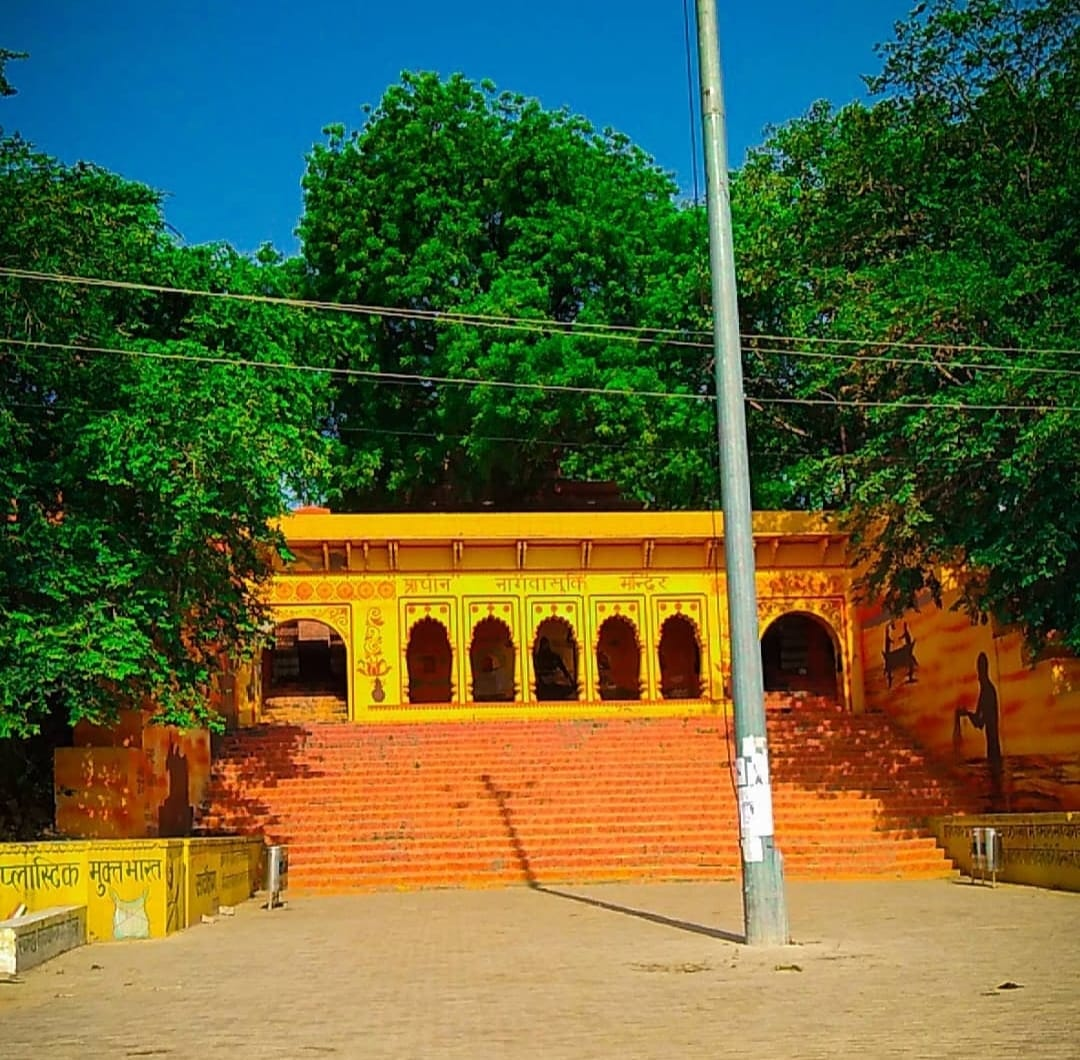
- Nagvasuki Temple, Prayagraj

- Location in Uttar Pradesh Nagvasuki Temple (India)

Religion
- Affiliation: Hinduism
- District: Prayagraj
- Deity: Vasuki (Serpent King)
- Festival: Nag Panchami
- Status: Active

Location
- Location: Daraganj, Prayagraj
- State: Uttar Pradesh
- Country: India

Architecture
- Type: Hindu temple architecture
- Creator: Shridhar Bhonsle (present structure)
- Established: 10th century CE (origins)
- Completed: 18th century

Nagvasuki Mandir is a Hindu temple located in Daraganj, Prayagraj, Uttar Pradesh, India. It is situated on the banks of the Ganga River and the temple is dedicated to Vasuki, the king of serpents in Hinduism.

== History ==
The origins of Nagvasuki Mandir trace back to the 10th century CE. The temple's present structure was established in the 18th century by Maratha king Shridhar Bhonsle.

=== Mythology ===
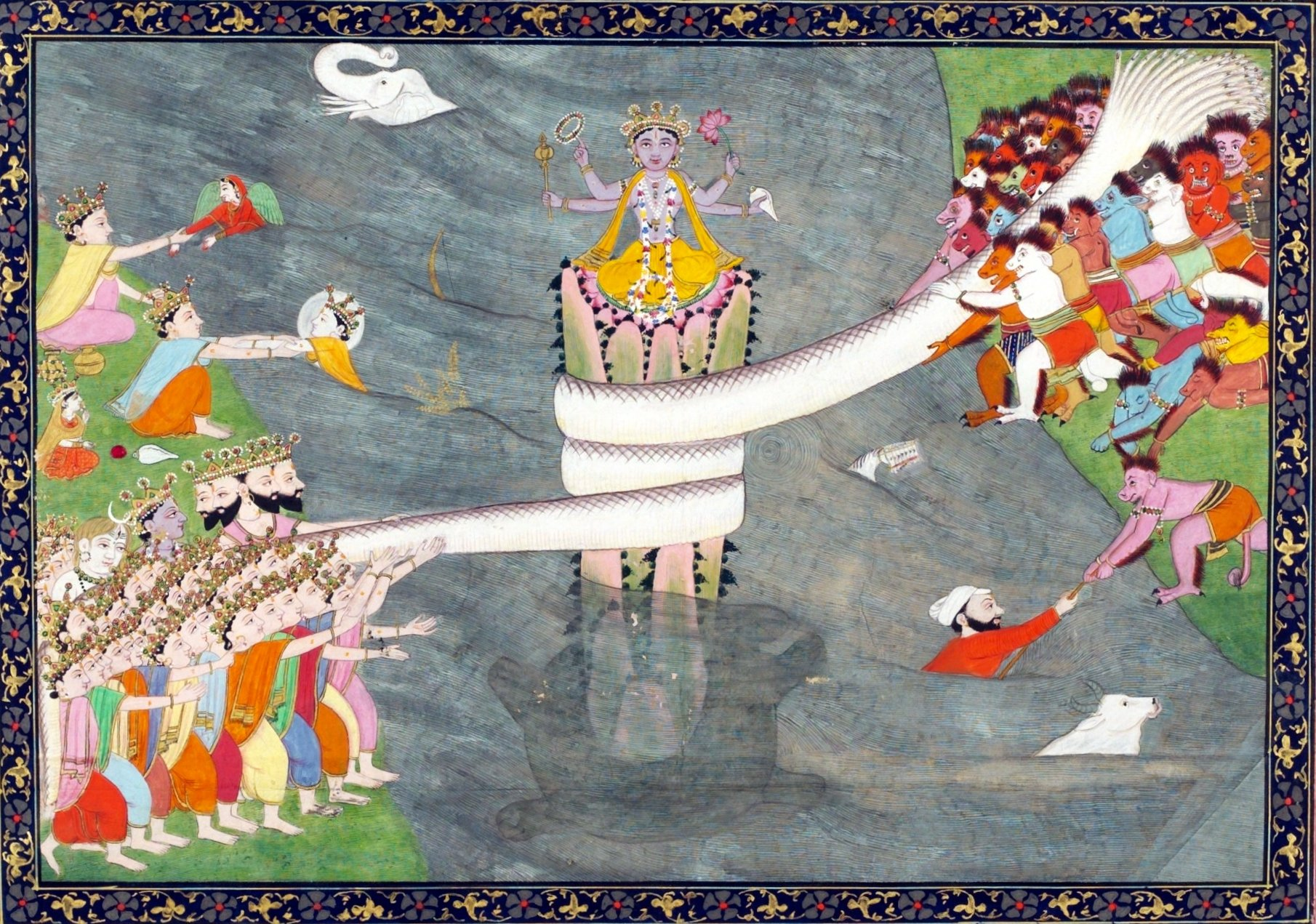
Kurma avatara of Vishnu, below Mount Mandara, with Vasuki wrapped around it, during Samudra Manthana, the churning of the Ocean of milk.

Ancient Hindu texts like the Skanda Purana, Padma Purana, Bhagavata Purana, and Mahabharata describe Naga Vasuki, the Serpent King, who played a crucial role in the Samudra Manthana. Acting as the churning rope while Mount Mandara served as the churning rod, he endured immense friction, leaving him with severe wounds. Following the Samudra Manthana, Vasuki rested at Prayag (modern-day Prayagraj) at Vishnu's request, where the holy Triveni Sangam healed his injuries.

Later, King Divodasa of Kashi (modern-day Varanasi) performed Tapasya (spiritual meditation) to bring Vasuki to Kashi. Vasuki was prepared to leave Prayag but decided to stay after the gods pleaded with him. He agreed on two conditions: devotees must visit him after bathing in the Sangam, and he must be worshipped on Nag Panchami. His temple was then established on the sacred northwestern bank of the Sangam.

== Deities ==
The temple complex has a sanctum sanctorum housing the idol of Nag Vasuki. Other deities in the temple include Shiva, Goddess Parvati, and Ganesha. A reclining statue of Bhishma is also placed on the premises. The temple is visited by thousands of devotees on Naga Panchami, and an annual grand fair is organized.
