= Beth Elohim =

Beth Elohim (Hebrew: בֵּית אֱלֹהִים "House of God") may refer to the following Jewish synagogues:

- Congregation Beth Elohim (Brooklyn, New York), a Reform synagogue founded in 1861
- Congregation Kahal Kadosh Beth Elohim, a Reform synagogue founded in the 1740s in Charleston, South Carolina
- Temple Beth Elohim (Georgetown, South Carolina), a Reform synagogue founded in 1904
