= Solomon Cohen Sr. =

Solomon Cohen
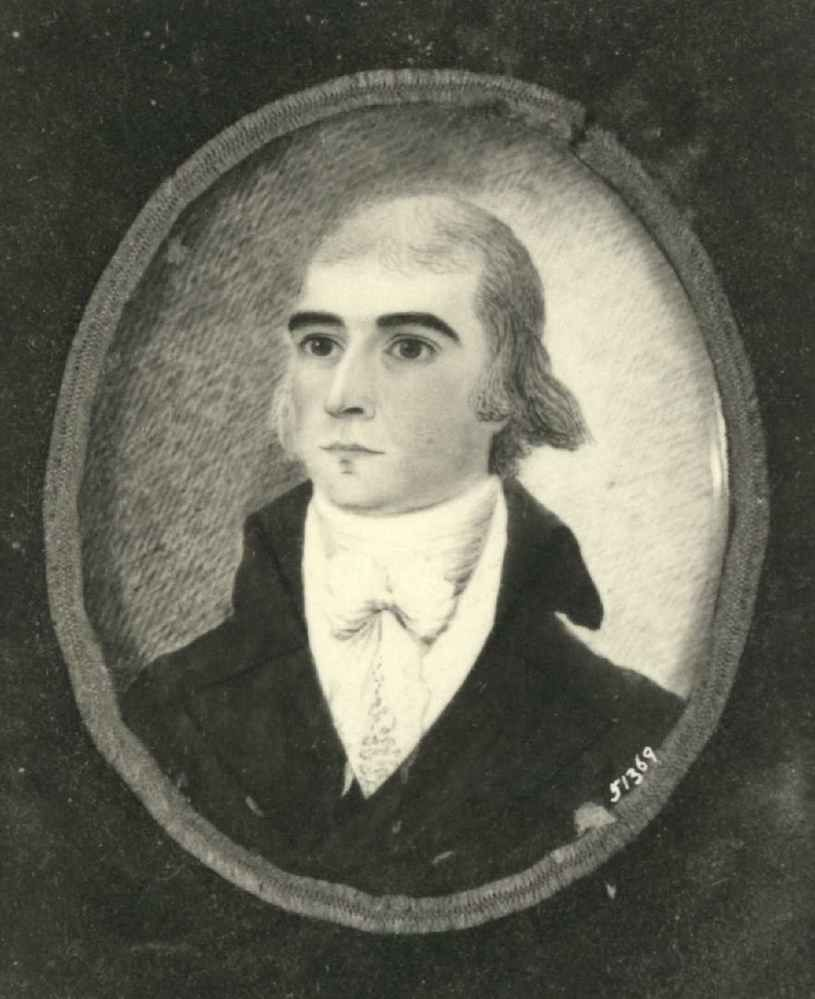
- Born: October 13, 1757; Charleston, Province of South Carolina
- Died: May 23, 1835 (aged 77); Savannah, Georgia, U.S.
- Resting place: Laurel Grove Cemetery, Savannah, Georgia, U.S.
- Spouse: Bella Moses (–1835; his death)
- Children: Solomon Cohen Jr.

Solomon Cohen Sr. (October 13, 1757 – May 23, 1835) was a merchant in both Charleston, South Carolina, and Savannah, Georgia, in the 18th and 19th centuries. He was also a slave owner.

== Life and career ==
Cohen was born in Charleston, Province of South Carolina, in 1757, to Moses Cohen and Dinah Congue. His father, born in England in 1709, was a founder and the first Rabbi of Temple Beth Elohim in Georgetown, South Carolina. His is the oldest tombstone in Charleston's Coming Street Cemetery.

He married Bella Moses, daughter of Myer Moses and Rachel Andrews, in 1796. Their son, Solomon Cohen Jr., became a noted lawyer in Savannah. Their daughter, Sarah Henrietta, married Savannah's Mordecai Myers II.

Cohen became a merchant and civic leader in Georgetown. He was also a slave owner, at one point "holding nine African citizens against their will." In a letter to his sister-in-law Emma Mordecai (sister of Mordecai Myers I, who married Cohen's sister, Esther), he wrote:

[I] believe that the institution of slavery was refining and civilizing to the whites, giving them an elevation of sentiment and ease and dignity of manners only attainable in societies under the restraining influence of a privileged class, and at the same time the only human institution that could elevate the Negro from barbarism and develop the small amount of intellect with which he is endowed.

== Death ==
Cohen died in 1835, aged 77. He is interred in Savannah's Laurel Grove Cemetery, alongside his wife, who survived him by 27 years.
