= Moti Nagar =

Moti Nagar may refer to these places in India:

- Moti Nagar, Delhi a neighbourhood of Delhi
  - Moti Nagar Assembly constituency
  - Moti Nagar metro station
- Moti Nagar, Hyderabad a neighbourhood of Hyderabad

== See also ==
- Moti (disambiguation)
- Nagar (disambiguation)
