= Rachel Mordecai Lazarus =

American educator

- Born: July 1, 1788; Goochland County, Virginia, U.S.
- Died: June 23, 1838 (aged 49); Petersburg, Virginia, U.S.
- Occupation: Educator
- Children: 4, including Marx Edgeworth Lazarus
- Father: Jacob Mordecai
- Relatives: Alfred Mordecai (brother); Emma Mordecai (sister); M. Catherine Allen (granddaughter)

Rachel Mordecai Lazarus (July 1, 1788 – June 23, 1838) was an American educator and correspondent with the Irish writer Maria Edgeworth.

== Early life and education ==
Rachel Mordecai was born in Virginia, the eldest daughter and second child of Jacob Mordecai and his first wife, Judith Myers. She was raised in Warrenton, North Carolina, where her father worked at a boys' school, then opened his own girls' school in 1809, with 21-year-old Rachel as one of the school's teachers. Rachel taught at her father's school until 1818.

== Correspondence with Maria Edgeworth ==
Rachel Mordecai first wrote to author Maria Edgeworth in 1815. Mordecai studied and admired the enlightened educational writings of Edgeworth and her father, Richard Lovell Edgeworth, and was disappointed by the unflattering stereotypical portrait of a Jewish character in Edgeworth's The Absentee (1812). Edgeworth's Harrington (1817) made a better effort at a Jewish character, in response to the criticism from Miss Mordecai. The families of Maria Edgeworth and Rachel Mordecai stayed in correspondence for over a hundred years after Rachel's death, until World War II.

== Marriage and children ==
Rachel Mordecai married widower Aaron Marks Lazarus in 1821, and moved to Wilmington, North Carolina, where she lived for the rest of her life. The Lazaruses had four children together, three daughters and a son, M. E. Lazarus, in a household that also included Mr. Lazarus's seven children from his first marriage. In 1835, when Rachel Lazarus announced that she felt moved to convert to Christianity, her husband threatened to keep her from her children. She was baptized on her deathbed in Petersburg, Virginia, a week before her 50th birthday.

Rachel Mordecai Lazarus's letters are in the Mordecai Family Papers at the Southern Historical Collection, the Pattie Mordecai Collection in the North Carolina State Archives, and the Jacob Mordecai Papers at Duke University, among other collections.
