= Motilal =

Motilal or Moti Lal is an Indian male given name. It may refer to:

- Motilal (actor) or Motilal Rajvansh (1910–1965), Indian film actor
- Moti Lal Dhar (1914–2002), Indian chemist
- Motilal Jain and Banarsidass Jain, founders of Motilal Banarsidass, an Indian publishing house on Sanskrit and Indology since 1903
- Motilal Jotwani, Indian writer, educationist
- Moti Lal Kemmu (1939–2018), Indian playwright
- Moti Lal Madan or M. L. Madan, Indian biologist
- Motilal Nehru (1861– 1931), Indian independence activist, leader of the Indian National Congress, patriarch of the Nehru-Gandhi family and father of the first Indian prime minister Jawaharlal Nehru
- Motilal Oswal, founder of Motilal Oswal Financial Services, an Indian financial services firm
- Moti Lal Prasad, Indian politician
- Motilal Roy, Indian independence activist
- Motilal Vora (1928–2020), member of the Indian National Congress, former chief minister of Madhya Pradesh, and former governor of Uttar Pradesh

== See also ==
- Moti (disambiguation)
- Lal (disambiguation)
