= Robert D. Abrahams =

Jewish-American lawyer, poet, and writer

Robert David Abrahams (September 21, 1905 – February 15, 1998) was a Jewish-American lawyer, poet, and writer.

== Early life and education ==
He was born in Philadelphia and graduated from the Dickinson School of Law at the age of 19.

== Career ==
Abrahams served on the Sesquicentennial Exposition board in 1926 and became assistant solicitor for the City of Philadelphia in 1927. He established the Philadelphia Neighborhood Law Office Plan in 1939.

Abrahams was President of the Pennsylvania Prison Society and served as consul for the Dominican Republic from 1931 to 1963. He also taught at Temple University.

== Publications ==
Abrahams wrote poems for The Saturday Evening Post and published three volumes of poetry: Come Forward (1928), The Pot-Bellied Gods (1932) and Three Dozen (1945). He also published a collection of short stories (New Tavern Tales, 1930) and several biographies about prominent Jews: Mr. Benjamin's Sword (1948) about Judah P. Benjamin, The Commodore (1954) about Uriah P. Levy, The Uncommon Soldier (1959) about Alfred Mordecai, and Sound of Bow Bells (1962) about Sir David Salomons.
