= Moti Mahal (Daraganj) =

16th-century fort in Prayagraj, India

- मोती महल
- Interactive map of the Moti Mahal area
- Alternative names: Todarmal Kila; Raja Todarmal Ka Kila

General information
- Type: Fort, Palace
- Architectural style: Mughal architecture
- Location: Daraganj, Prayagraj, Uttar Pradesh, India, India
- Coordinates: 25.4513°N 81.8845°E
- Construction started: 1585
- Completed: c. 1590
- Client: Todar Mal
- Owner: Agrawal family

Technical details
- Material: Lakhori bricks
- Floor area: 40,000 sq ft (3,700 m^{2})

Moti Mahal (translated as Moti Palace), also known as Todarmal Kila and Raja Todarmal Ka Kila, is a historic building and fort in Daraganj, Prayagraj, Uttar Pradesh, India. It stands near the Ganges and was built by Raja Todar Mal, an administrator in the court of Mughal emperor Akbar. The building dates to the late 16th century.

Moti Mahal housed Daraganj High School from 1911 until 1933. A portion of the fort is currently operated as a heritage accommodation.

== History ==
The foundation of Moti Mahal is dated to 1585, and construction was completed around 1590. It was built during the construction of Akbar's fort at Allahabad and was used by Todar Mal as a camp while the fort was being built.

The structure covers about 40,000 square feet and included a Diwan-e-Aam, Diwan-e-Khas, rooms for soldiers, stables and a court hall with carved supports. A large hall remains in the northwestern part of the second floor, while a room in the western section is identified by the family as Todar Mal's room.

The building was constructed with Lakhauri bricks. It also contained residential quarters, a kitchen and a temple, and originally had six entrances.

Moti Mahal was used as Todar Mal's secretariat. The first floor contained an armoury and quarters for ministers and military commanders.

An account attributed to Todar Mal's descendants states that Nawab Shuja-ud-Daula of Awadh seized Moti Mahal in 1745. Lord Clive defeated Shuja-ud-Daula in 1746 and restored the property to Todar Mal's descendants, before Warren Hastings took possession of it in 1785.

=== 1857 uprising ===
During the Indian Rebellion of 1857, rebels took shelter in Moti Mahal and were attacked by British troops under Colonel James George Neill on 12 June 1857. Artillery fire damaged the building, including five of its six gates.

== Architecture ==
Moti Mahal contains features of Mughal-period architecture. The building had large halls, residential rooms, soldiers' quarters, a stable and service areas. The court hall has carved supports, while parts of the upper floors remain in use. A temple dedicated to Ganesha stands on the side facing the Ganges. The use of Lakhauri bricks and the layout of the halls and other rooms are among the features noted in accounts of the building.

== Later use ==
Moti Mahal housed Daraganj High School from 1911 until the school moved to another building in 1933.

A news report published in The Pioneer Mail on 23 December 1921 identified Raja Moti Chand as the owner of Moti Mahal and stated that Daraganj High School had been occupying the building for seven years. It reported that Moti Chand waived the school's rent for one year in honour of the Prince of Wales' visit to India, citing the school's financial difficulties, which it attributed mainly to the Non-Cooperation Movement.

The building later continued to be used as a residence. Members of the Agrawal family have identified themselves as seventeenth-generation descendants of Todar Mal and preserved an Urdu-language genealogy recording their lineage.

In 2020, members of the family were living in Moti Mahal and looking after parts of the property. Eight tenants were also reported to be living in the building, paying monthly rents of ₹50 to ₹100. The family also ran a grocery shop for income.

A portion of Moti Mahal has been renovated and is currently operated as a heritage accommodation under the name Kila Todarmal Heritage Stays.

== Condition and conservation ==
In 2006, Hindustan Times reported that Moti Mahal was in poor condition, with moss covering parts of the structure and surrounding development affecting the building.

In 2019, family members said that several hotel operators had offered to renovate Moti Mahal, but the proposals were rejected because they believed the operators wanted to acquire the property. In 2020, parts of the walls were reported to be cracked, while some decorative work had deteriorated. Five of the six gates were no longer intact.

In 2022, damage to the walls and masonry was again reported. Garbage had accumulated around the building, while cattle were being kept in the former stable and cow-dung cakes were being dried near the Diwan-e-Aam.

== See also ==
- Allahabad Fort
- Todar Mal
- Daraganj
