= Ramesh Nagar metro station =

Metro station in Delhi, India

Ramesh Nagar

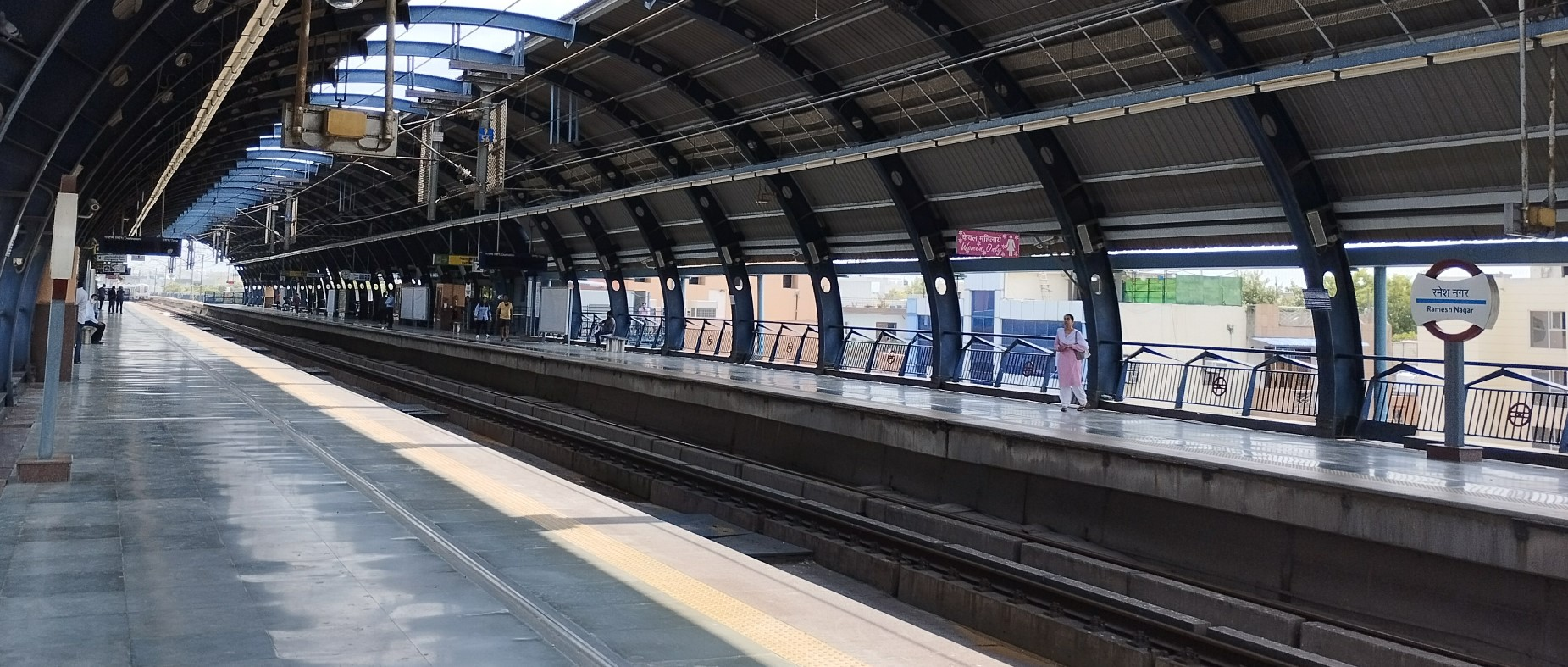

General information
- Location: Ramesh Nagar, New Delhi, 110015
- Coordinates: 28°39′11″N 77°07′53″E
- System: Delhi Metro station
- Owner: Delhi Metro
- Operator: Delhi Metro Rail Corporation (DMRC)
- Line: Blue Line
- Platforms: Side platform; Platform-1 → Noida Electronic City / Vaishali; Platform-2 → Dwarka Sector 21
- Tracks: 2

Construction
- Structure type: Elevated, Double-track
- Platform levels: 2
- Parking: Available
- Accessible: Yes

Other information
- Status: Staffed, Operational
- Station code: RN

History
- Opened: 31 December 2005; 20 years ago
- Electrified: 25 kV 50 Hz AC through overhead catenary

Passengers
- Jan 2015: 12,682/day 393,156/ Month average

Services
| Preceding station | Delhi Metro | Following station |
|---|---|---|
| Rajouri Garden towards Dwarka Sector 21 | Blue Line | Moti Nagar towards Noida Electronic City or Vaishali |
Route map
Location

The Ramesh Nagar metro station is located on the Blue Line of the Delhi Metro.

== The station ==
=== Station layout ===
| L2 | Side platform | Doors will open on the left |
| L2 | Platform 1 Eastbound | Towards → Noida Electronic City / Vaishali; Next Station: Moti Nagar |
| L2 | Platform 2 Westbound | Towards ← Dwarka Sector 21; Next Station: Rajouri Garden Change at the next station for Pink Line |
| L2 | Side platform | Doors will open on the left |
| L1 | Concourse | Fare control, station agent, Metro Card vending machines, crossover |
| G | Street Level | Exit/Entrance |

== Entry/Exit ==
Ramesh Nagar metro station Entry/exits
| Gate No-1 | Gate No-2 | Gate No-3 | Gate No-4 | Gate No-5 |
|---|---|---|---|---|
| Bali Nagar | Basai Darapur | Raja Garden | Namdhari Colony | Ramesh Nagar |

== Connections ==
=== Bus ===
Delhi Transport Corporation bus routes number 234, 308, 408, 408CL, 408EXTCL, 410, 410ACL, 410CL, 801, 810, 813, 813CL, 816, 816A, 816EXT, 817, 817A, 817B, 820, 823, 832, 833, 841, 842, 847, 857, 871, 871A, 908, WDM (-) serves the station from outside metro station stop.

== See also ==
- Delhi
- List of Delhi Metro stations
- Transport in Delhi
- Delhi Metro Rail Corporation
- Delhi Suburban Railway
- Delhi Monorail
- National Capital Region (India)
- List of rapid transit systems
- List of metro systems
