= Moti Mahal =

Moti Mahal may refer to:

- Moti Mahal (restaurant), an Indian restaurant where well known dishes originated
- Moti Mahal (Gulshan-e-Iqbal), one of the oldest houses in Karachi, Pakistan
- Moti Shahi Mahal, the Sardar Vallabhbhai Patel National Memorial
- Moti Mahal (Lucknow), campus of the English and Foreign Languages University
- Moti Mahal, 1952 film by Hansraj Behl
- Moti Mahal (Daraganj), a 16th-century building and fort in Daraganj, Prayagraj, built by Raja Todar Mal
