= St. Mark's Chapel (Raleigh, North Carolina) =

- U.S. Historic district – Contributing property
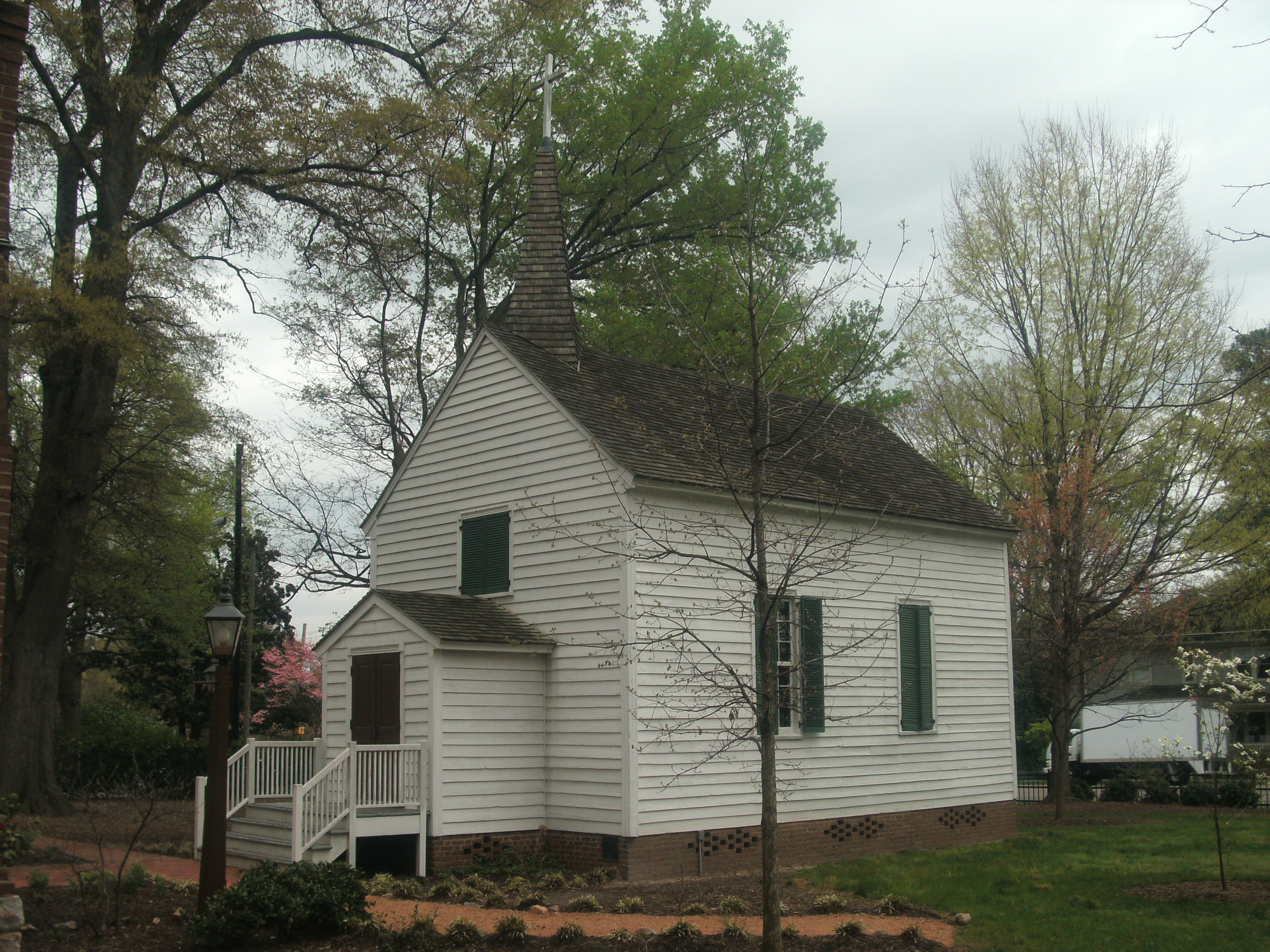
- St. Mark's Chapel in March, 2015
- Location: Raleigh, North Carolina
- Area: Mordecai Park
- Built: 1847
- Part of: Mordecai House (ID70000474)
- Added to NRHP: July 1, 1970

Saint Mark's Chapel is a small, formerly Episcopal chapel located on the grounds of the Mordecai House in downtown Raleigh, North Carolina. The chapel, along with the rest of the Mordecai plantation, is on the National Register of Historic Places. The chapel is a very popular place for weddings.

== History ==
The Episcopalian St. Mark's Chapel was built by slave carpenters in 1847 on the Chatham County plantation of John Haughton. The chapel was moved to Siler City in 1953 for use by another congregation. Mordecai Historic Park received the chapel in 1979 and it is in use today for weddings, meetings, seminars, and lectures.

== See also ==
- Historic Oakwood
- Historic Oakwood Cemetery
