= New Tavern Tales =

1930 book by Robert D. Abrahams

New Tavern Tales is a short story collection by Robert D. Abrahams. It was published by The Neale Publishing Company in 1930. The book is a collection of thirteen narratively unconnected stories being told by guests at a tavern. The Cincinnati Post described the stories as being an "evening of yarns" (a "yarn" is a story with excessive narration and an anticlimax).

It was received positively by critics. The Buffalo Times and The Morning Post praised Abrahams for his character work and emotional language, with the former writing that "a vein of subtle philosophy" thread through the various stories and the latter noting the book's "artistic writing." The Wichita Eagle described the book as dealing with themes of aspiration and endurance and commented positively about Abrahams' humor. The Jewish Exponent wrote that the book was a strong debut work for Abrahams and noted that while the individual stories were not connected narratively, they shared common themes.
