= Gratz Cohen =

Confederate soldier in the American Civil War

- Cohen, pictured around 1862
- Born: November 3, 1844; Savannah, Georgia, U.S.
- Died: March 19, 1865 (aged 20); Bentonville Battlefield, North Carolina, U.S.
- Cause of death: Killed in action
- Resting place: Laurel Grove Cemetery, Savannah, Georgia, U.S.
- Parent(s): Solomon Cohen Jr. Miriam Gratz Moses

Gratz Cohen (November 3, 1844 – March 19, 1865) was a Confederate Army captain during the American Civil War. He fought in the Battle of Averasborough and the Battle of Bentonville. He was killed in the latter, aged 20.

== Life and career ==
Cohen was born in 1844, in Savannah, Georgia, to Solomon Cohen Jr. and Miriam Gratz Moses.

In 1847, noted author Rebecca Gratz, his maternal great-aunt, met Cohen when his mother brought he and his sister, Miriam, to visit her in Philadelphia.

By the age of six, Cohen was exploring Savannah, then a booming cotton city, on his own.

In the mid-1850s, he spent a "languorous" summer at Fort Pulaski. A disability, rumored as being flat feet, affected him earlier in his life and resulted in his wearing a special boot and a leg brace. It had now restricted his ability to undertake sentry duty. His mother sent him his books downriver, and his fellow soldiers "petted" him "as la fille du regiment was described to have been," "Gratz reported to his mother, comparing himself to the tomboy heroine of Donizetti's opera, the orphan girl who becomes the mascot of the French regiment that adopts her," wrote Jason K. Friedman in 2021.

In June 1861, aged 16, he was enlisted in the Savannah Artillery. By the end of the summer, he was appointed aide, with a rank of captain, on the staff of General George Paul Harrison Jr. In representing the Confederate Army, he declared it "the duty of every Southern state to leave the Union," which he believed existed only in name. His father did not share his son's opinion, but he did acquiesce to his wishes to convert from Orthodox Judaism to Reform.

Over the winter of 1861–1862, Gratz joined a Confederate military unit tasked with defending the Georgia coast, which was becoming a Union stronghold. He was accompanied by "valet" Louis, a slave of his father's, whom Gratz had grown up with. Louis used the chaos of war to make his escape, however. Gratz lamented his loss of a "faithful servant" in a poem.

Early in 1862, he was injured and returned to his hometown, where he studied law and wrote a novel. He was the first known Jewish student at the University of Virginia (UVA), which he attended between 1862 and 1864. It was during his time at college that he wrote about his homosexuality. He left UVA in the summer of his sophomore year.

After returning to Savannah in 1864, he served as acting secretary of a medical board, similar to one he had turned down in Charlottesville, Virginia.

Towards the end of 1864, part way into Sherman's March to the Sea, Cohen left Savannah as a volunteer aide, without pay, again on the staff of Harrison, but this time as Brigadier-General. In addition to his disabilities, he was now suffering from typhoid fever. "I almost hoped for death rather than become a burthen to those I love. I am now better, tho' still feeble, pale & very thin. Friends would pass me by without recognizing me they say I am so changed," he wrote in his journal.

Travelling from the Savannah River to North Carolina, he fought in the Battle of Averasborough, for which he was commended.

== Death ==
On March 19, 1865, Cohen was in action in the Battle of Bentonville, albeit against the advice of his surgeon. He was killed in the battle, aged 20, less than a month before General Robert E. Lee surrendered at the Battle of Appomattox Court House. He had just taken a report to his general when he was killed by a bullet to his head. He was initially buried near Bentonville Battlefield by comrade Frank O'Driscoll, but in February 1866 O'Driscoll, who had married Gratz's sister Belle shortly beforehand, retrieved his remains and he was re-interred in Savannah's Laurel Grove Cemetery, alongside his parents. His headstone reads "To our only and beloved son."

Her son's death affected his mother, Miriam, greatly. She could not bring herself to be in the family home, at today's 116–120 West Liberty Street in Savannah, so she and her husband went on a grand tour of Europe. His sister, Miriam, named her first-born child in his memory in 1881.
