= Solomon Cohen Jr. =

American lawyer

Solomon Cohen
- Cohen and his family, around 1854. His children are Gratz (left), Miriam (center) and Belle (right)
- Born: August 15, 1802; Georgetown, South Carolina, U.S.
- Died: August 14, 1875 (aged 72); Savannah, Georgia, U.S.
- Resting place: Laurel Grove Cemetery, Savannah, Georgia, U.S.
- Occupation: lawyer
- Spouse: Miriam Gratz Moses (1836–1875; his death)
- Children: Gratz Cohen
- Parent(s): Solomon Cohen Sr. Bella Moses

Solomon Cohen Jr. (August 15, 1802 – August 14, 1875) was a lawyer, prominent in Savannah, Georgia, where he was also postmaster, the state's first Jewish senator, a district attorney, a real-estate developer and banker. He established the first Jewish Sunday School in Georgia.

He is mentioned in the memoirs of General William Tecumseh Sherman as being a "rich lawyer".

== Life and career ==
Cohen was born in 1802 in Georgetown, South Carolina, to Solomon Cohen Sr. and Bella Moses. He was the first Jewish birth in Georgetown County. One of his siblings, brother Octavus, was a cotton merchant. His brother-in-law was Isaac Minis, husband of his sister Dinah.

He was educated at South Carolina College (now the University of South Carolina), where he befriended fellow student Joshua John Ward, who went on to become lieutenant-governor of South Carolina.

He served as director of the Bank of South Carolina from 1819 to 1826. From 1831 to 1835, he represented Prince George's Parish in the South Carolina House of Representatives; as a state legislator, he served as a leader of its Nullification faction. On November 28, 1835, he was elected as the Georgetown District's Commissioner in Equity (an administrative position within South Carolina's courts of equity); he resigned his seat in the House by accepting that position on December 18 of the same year. In 1837, he was elected intendant of Georgetown.

In 1836, he married Miriam Gratz Moses, niece of Rebecca Gratz, a philanthropist from Philadelphia. They had three known children, two of whom died relatively young (including Gratz, who was killed in the Battle of Bentonville, aged 20). Daughter Miriam Gratz lived until the age of 80. She was married to James Troup Dent Sr., a Confederate Army veteran.

Cohen was the de facto publisher and distributor of the works of Grace Aguilar, the English novelist who was of interest to his wife and her aunt.

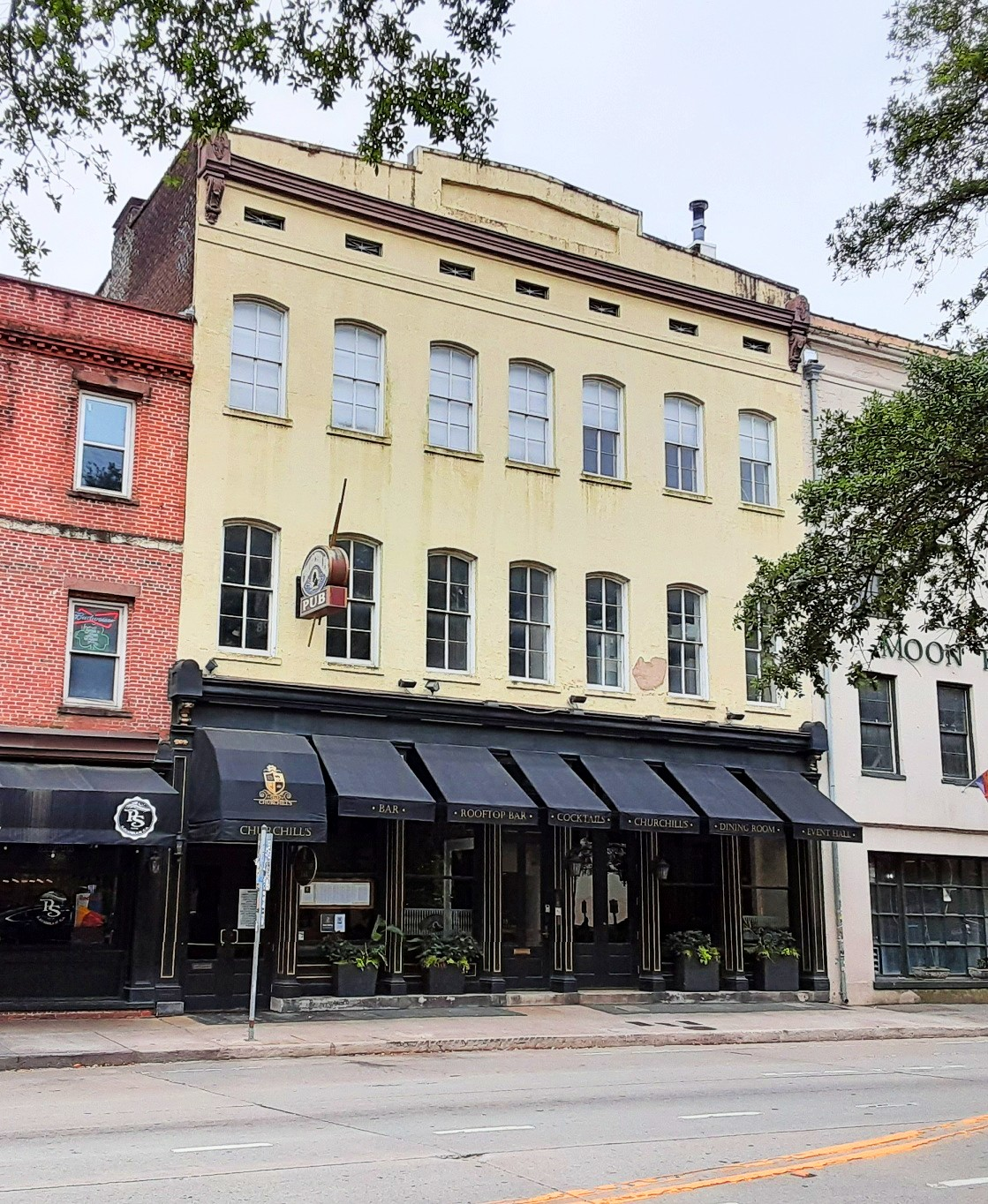
17 West Bay Street in Savannah is known as the Solomon Cohen Building. It was built for Cohen in 1869

In 1839, Cohen and his brother-in-law Mordecai Myers (husband of his sister Sarah Henrietta) helped established the Georgia Historical Society. Cohen was its treasurer between 1841 and 1844, and its vice-president between 1864 and 1868.

He served as the president of the Congregation Mickve Israel for several years.

Shortly before his death, Cohen had built the home at today's 116–120 West Liberty Street, an addition to the 1851-built number 124.

Cohen was a slave-owner. At one point, he owned eight slaves and hired out an additional fifteen.

He was a member of Georgetown's Winyah Indigo Society, and a charter member of the Georgetown's Planters Club.

=== Properties ===
In addition to his home at 116–120 West Liberty Street, Cohen also built properties at 124 West Liberty Street (1851) and 17 West Bay Street (1869).

== Death ==
Cohen died in 1875, aged 72. He is interred in Savannah's Laurel Grove Cemetery, alongside his wife, who survived him by sixteen years.
