= Mordecai House =

Historic house in North Carolina, United States

- U.S. National Register of Historic Places
- U.S. Historic district – Contributing property
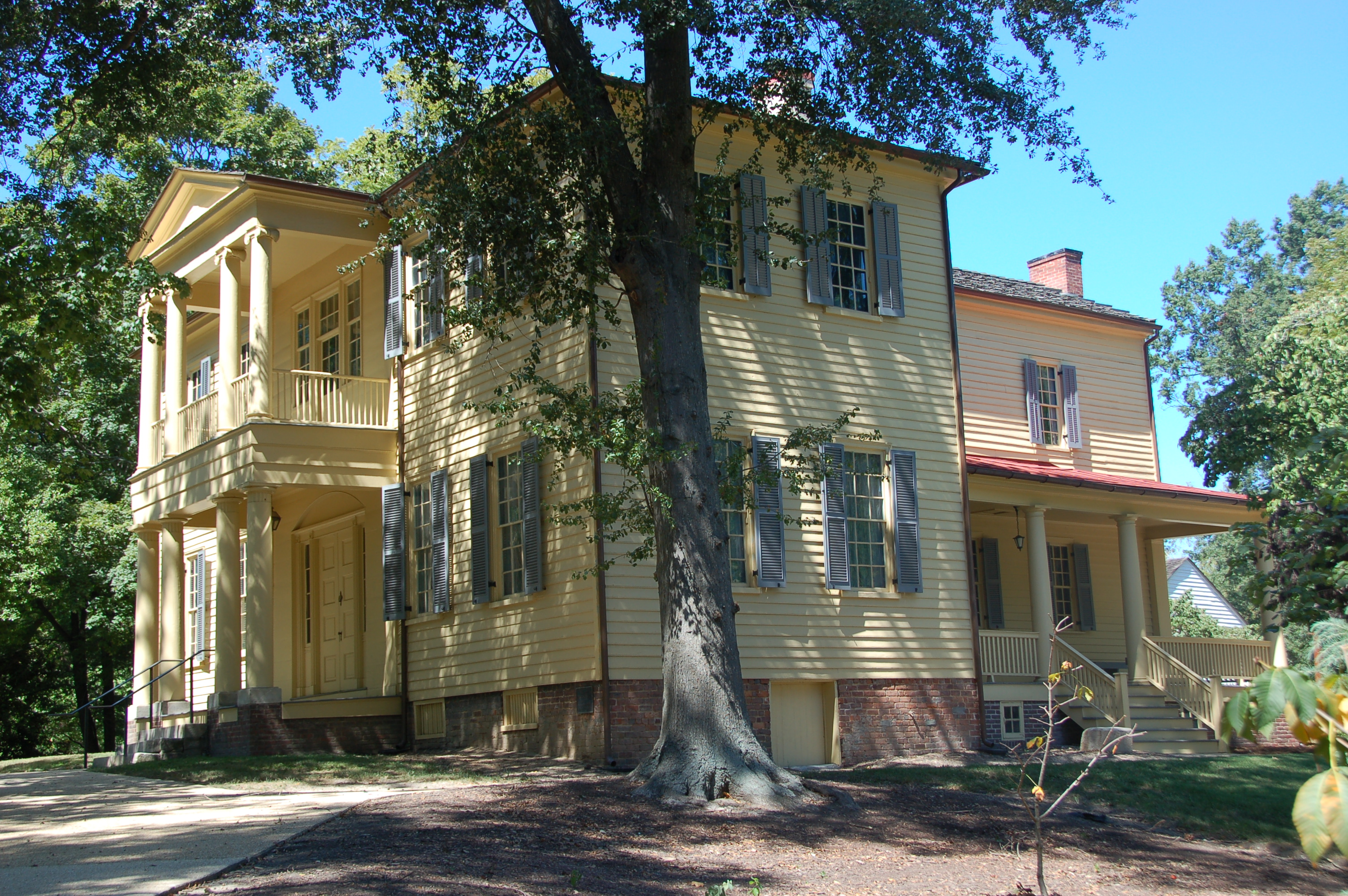

- Location within North Carolina Location within the United States
- Location: Mimosa St., Raleigh, North Carolina
- Coordinates: 35°47′33.27″N 78°38′0.14″W
- Area: 3.9 acres (1.6 ha)
- Built by: Joel Lane
- Architect: William Nichols (1824 renovation)
- Architectural style: Hall and Parlor/Federal/Greek Revival
- NRHP reference No.: 70000474
- Added to NRHP: July 1, 1970

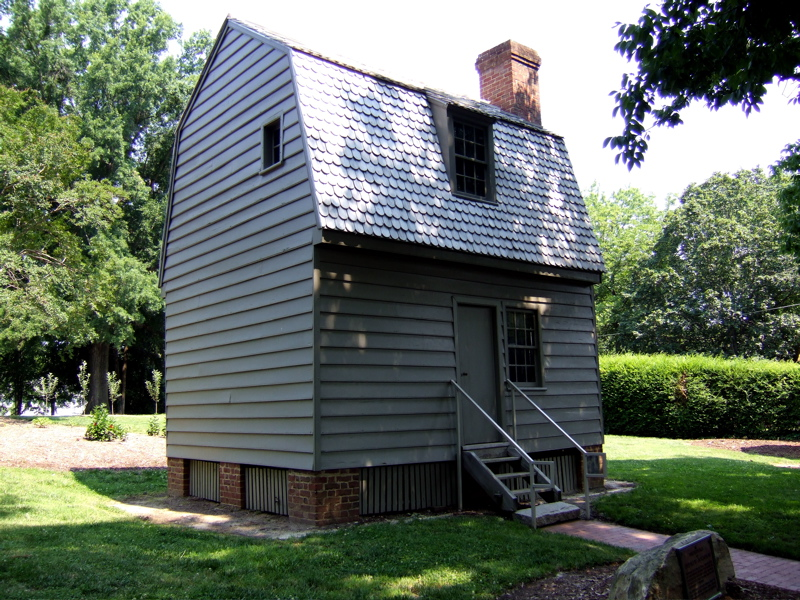
U.S. President Andrew Johnson's birthplace and childhood home is located in the park

The Mordecai House (/mɔːrdəˈki/, also called the Mordecai Plantation or Mordecai Mansion), built in 1785, is a registered historical landmark and museum in Raleigh, North Carolina that is the centerpiece of Mordecai Historic Park, adjacent to the Historic Oakwood neighborhood. It is the oldest residence in Raleigh on its original foundation. In addition to the house, the Park includes the birthplace and childhood home of President Andrew Johnson, the Ellen Mordecai Garden, the Badger-Iredell Law Office, Allen Kitchen and St. Mark's Chapel, a popular site for weddings. It is located in the Mordecai Place Historic District.

The oldest portion of the house was built by Joel Lane for his son, Henry. At one time, the plantation house was the center of a 5,000-acre (20 km^{2}) plantation, one of the largest in Wake County. Lane is considered a founder of Raleigh, as 1,000 acres was sold from his plantation as the site of the city.

The house was named after Moses Mordecai, whose first wife, Margaret Lane, had inherited it from her father Henry. After she died, Mordecai married her sister Ann Lane. In 1824, Mordecai hired William Nichols, State Architect at the time, to enlarge the house. The addition was considered a significant work of Nichols, who had also been responsible for remodeling the original building containing the State House. With the addition of the four new rooms in 1826, the Mordecai house was transformed into a Greek Revival mansion.

The Mordecai family, descended from immigrant grandfather Moses Mordecai of Bonn, Germany, became one of the original three hundred Jewish families in the United States and one of the few of Ashkenazic Jewish descent. The family members were prominent in local and state affairs. Jacob Mordecai, Moses' father, founded a girls' school in Warrenton, North Carolina. A prominent lawyer, the younger Moses Mordecai was a member of the 1805 Court of Conference. With his first wife, Margaret, he had two sons, Henry and Jacob, and one daughter, Ellen. He and his second wife, Ann, had a daughter named Margaret after his late wife, Ann's sister. Henry Mordecai became a prosperous planter at Mordecai House and was elected to the State Legislature. Fourteen slaves lived on the former plantation and worked in the home and the fields. His daughter, Margaret Mordecai, married and inherited the mansion; her descendants owned and occupied Mordecai House until 1967.

During the 19th and early 20th centuries, the Mordecai family sold off land, which was subdivided for the continuing expansion of Raleigh. In 1867, George Washington Mordecai donated land east of the city to establish a Confederate cemetery; he donated another plot for Wake County's first Hebrew Cemetery. (The adjacent Oakwood Cemetery, chartered in 1869, became the namesake of the large suburb that developed in the adjoining wooded land, which was earlier known as Mordecai Grove. In 1974, Oakwood became the first neighborhood in Raleigh to be listed in the National Register of Historic Places.)

Mordecai descendants owned the mansion property until 1967, when the house and its surrounding block were put on the market. Local preservationists protested and the city purchased the property, turning it over to the Raleigh Historic Sites Commission to supervise and develop as a historic park. The commission was able to obtain many original Mordecai furnishings, as well as preserve the family papers and library. Mordecai Historic Park is now managed by the City of Raleigh's Parks, Recreation and Cultural Resources Department. The Mordecai House is a designated Raleigh Historic Landmark.

== Haunted history and folklore ==
The Mordecai House, a historic residence in Raleigh, North Carolina, has been the subject of local anecdotes about paranormal activity since the late 20th century. Multiple local media outlets have reported on community claims of unexplained phenomena at the property, and the Mordecai Historic Park (which manages the house) references these stories in its visitor guides as part of the site’s local folklore. It was featured in a season two episode of Ghost Hunters in which the TAPS team investigated some of those claims. From 2008 to 2016, the National Society of Paranormal Investigation and Research (NSPIR) had a contract with the City of Raleigh to be the exclusive paranormal research team for the park. Since 2017, Mordecai Historic Park's exclusive paranormal research team has been The Ghost Guild Inc., a registered nonprofit organization that investigates the house and its surrounding buildings at least three times per year. They present their findings at the park's annual Festival the last Saturday of October.

Visitors and workers have reported seeing a woman wearing a long black skirt, white blouse and a black tie moving quietly through the hallways. It has been rumored that she can sometimes be seen standing on the balcony if you pass by late at night. In recent years, visitors have recounted hearing a piano playing.

== See also ==
- List of Registered Historic Places in North Carolina
- List of reportedly haunted places in North Carolina
- List of the oldest buildings in North Carolina
- List of residences of presidents of the United States
