= Marx Edgeworth Lazarus =

American anarchist (1822–1896)

Marx Edgeworth Lazarus (February 6, 1822 – 1896) was an American individualist anarchist, Fourierist, and free-thinker. Lazarus was a practicing doctor of homeopathy who also wrote a number of books and articles, some under the pseudonym "Edgeworth". His works include Love vs. Marriage (1852) and Land Tenure: Anarchist View (1889). He was the only son of Rachel Mordecai Lazarus, who had an extensive correspondence with the Anglo-Irish novelist Maria Edgeworth.

== Early life and education ==
Marx Lazarus was born in 1822 in Wilmington, North Carolina, the son of teacher Rachel Mordecai Lazarus and her husband Aaron Lazarus (1777–1841), a Jewish widower and merchant. He was named for his grandfather, "Marks" [sic] and for Maria Edgeworth. Educated by his mother, Lazarus was enrolled by his father, over his mother's objections, at Georgetown College in Washington, D.C. in 1834. He became the first self-identified Jewish student to enroll at that school, later to become Georgetown University, the nation's largest and oldest Jesuit university. After Georgetown, Lazarus enrolled in the medical school at the University of Pennsylvania and completed his degree at New York University, becoming a doctor of homeopathic medicine.

== Career and activism ==
Even before obtaining his medical degree, Lazarus was interested in alternative approaches to health, personal relations, and social structures. Setting up practice in New York City, Lazarus practiced homeopathy and pursued "hydropathy," a "water-cure" for illness involving cold baths and wrapping in wet sheets, bland vegetarian meals, and exercise. Even while a student, Lazarus had visited the water-cure boarding house of Dr. Joel Shew and his wife Mary, major proponents of hydropathy and "natural hygiene." The Shews introduced Lazarus to Mary Gove, who lectured to female audiences on anatomy, health, and hygiene, as well as treating patients. In turn, Gove took an interest in mentoring Lazarus's younger sister, Ellen.

In 1846, Lazarus partnered with Gove, arranging for her and her daughter (from her first marriage) to live with him in a large house on Tenth Street in lower Manhattan, where she could lecture and work with patients, some of whom also lived in the house as paying guests. Although this mix of married and unmarried women and men was unorthodox if not scandalous, the relationship between Gove and Lazarus was likely a purely asectic one.

Along with his medical interests, Lazarus was attracted to radical social concepts, including the "free love" movement and "Associationism," an American utopian socialist version of Fourierism, which came to consume more and more of his time. He contributed articles to the Fourierist journal The Harbinger (previously The Phalanx), also writing ten books in 1851-1852, where he espoused, in the words of scholar Emily Bingham, "a combination of Fourier's communalism, Emanuel Swedenborg's mysticism, and American transcendentalism."

Among those books was Love vs. Marriage (1852), where he argued that marriage as an institution was akin to "legalized prostitution," oppressing women and men by allowing loveless marriages contracted for economic or utilitarian reasons to take precedence over true love. For those paying attention, Lazarus's book was subjected to severe criticism. A review by Henry James, Sr., whom Lazarus had cited in the book and himself a promoter of Swedenborg's theology, touched off a heated debate in the pages of the New York Tribune.

== Mental struggles, Civil War, and later life ==
Through his adult life, Lazarus tried to cope with apparent mental and physical disturbances, in particular what seemed to be chronic nocturnal emissions, a condition that at the time was labeled "seminal incontinence" or "spermatorrhea," believed to be detrimental and even fatal to the mind and body. Lazarus sought treatments through homeopathy, hyropathy, and electromagnetic treatments that seemed to bring some temporary relief. He also discussed the condition in his 1852 book Involuntary Seminal Losses: Their Causes, Effects, and Cure," where he suggested that the total sexual abstinence that he had tried to practice might be one of those causes. In 1855, Lazarus shocked some of his fellow Fourierists and free love advocates by marrying a 19 year old woman from Indiana, Mary Laurie (or "Lawrie).

By the mid-1850s, social movements like Fourierism were in decline, and Lazarus's later life seems to have had less focus. When the Civil War broke out, most members of Lazarus's extended family lived in Southern states and generally supported the Confederate cause. In 1861, Lazarus, was staying with relatives in Columbus, Georgia and joined the local City Light Guard when war broke out, later serving as company physician for the Wilmington, NC Artillery. However, he returned to private practice during the war, first in Richmond, Virginia and later in Asheville, North Carolina, where another sister, Julia, lived.

After the war, Lazarus continued to practice his areas of medicine and contributed articles and comments to various publications. By his last years, though, he had become a disenchanted recluse known as the "Sand Mountain Hermit" of Jackson County, Alabama. He died in his isolated cabin in 1896 and was buried in Guntersville, Alabama.
