= Mordecai Halberstadt =

Personal life
- Born: Halberstadt
- Died: 1770 Düsseldorf

Religious life
- Religion: Judaism
- Main work: Ma'amar Mordekhai (1782)

Mordecai Halberstadt (Yiddish: מרדכי האלבערשטאט; died 1770), also known as Mordecai of Düsseldorf, was a German rabbi and grammarian.

== Biography ==
He was born in Halberstadt, and studied around 1730 in Frankfurt am Main under Jacob ha-Kohen. He afterwards became a teacher in the rabbinical school of his hometown. Despite his young age, he was appointed av bet din of Griesheim on the recommendation of his former teacher. He later served as rabbi in Darmstadt and Düsseldorf.

Halberstadt was known as a scholar of Kabbalah. During the controversy over Jonathan Eybeschütz's amulets, Samuel Heilmann of Metz and Jacob Joshua Falk consulted him to determine whether the amulets were Sabbatean. Halberstadt declined to give a definitive judgment, stating that he could not conclusively classify the amulets as Sabbatean. He advised against continuing the personal attacks on Eybeschütz, and instead recommended issuing a general letter signed by all leading rabbinic authorities formally excommunicating the followers of the Sabbatean movement.

He authored Ma'amar Mordekhai, a collection of responsa published in Brünn in 1782, which included a critique of Solomon Hanau. His scholarship helped expose forged rabbinical rulings falsely attributed to Rabbis Isaiah Horowitz and Ephraim Luntschitz, which had influenced rabbinical decisions in the Rhineland and Westphalia for over a century. He also wrote an unpublished work on Hebrew grammar.
