= Mordecai Place Historic District =

Historic district in North Carolina, United States

- U.S. National Register of Historic Places
- U.S. Historic district
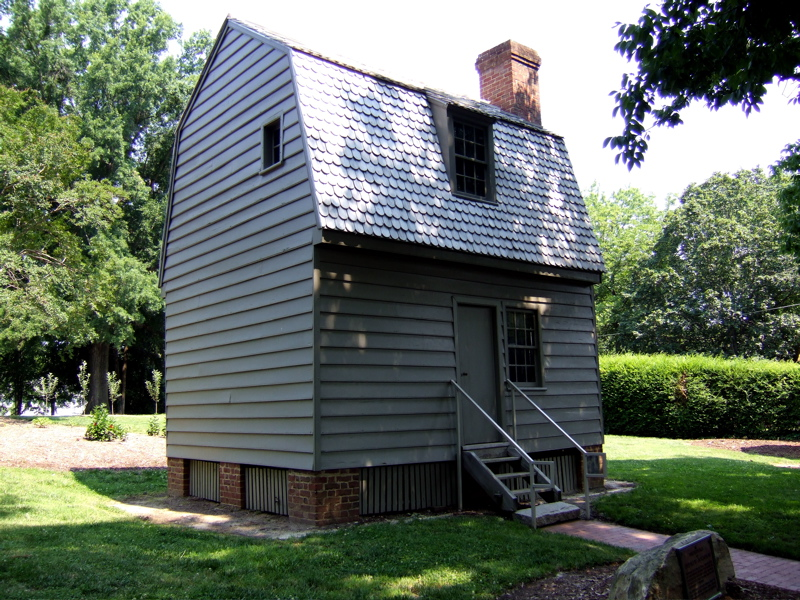
- Birthplace of Andrew Johnson

- Location within North Carolina Location within the United States
- Location: Roughly bounded by N. Blount St., Courtland Dr., Old Wake Forest Rd. and Mordecai Dr., 208 Delway St., Raleigh, North Carolina
- Coordinates: 35°47′30″N 78°37′58″W
- Area: 95 acres (38 ha)
- Built: 1785
- Architect: James Salter, Rose and Linthicum, et al.
- Architectural style: Bungalow/craftsman, Colonial Revival, Classical Revival
- NRHP reference No.: 97001668, 00001570 (Boundary Increase)
- Added to NRHP: February 4, 1998, December 28, 2000 (Boundary Increase)

Mordecai Place Historic District (/mɔːrdəˈki/) is a historic neighborhood and national historic district located at Raleigh, North Carolina. The district encompasses 182 contributing buildings and 1 contributing object in the most architecturally varied of Raleigh's early-20th century suburbs for the white middle-class. Mordecai Place was listed on the National Register of Historic Places in February 1998, with a boundary increase in 2000.

== History ==
The land was originally home to a plantation house built by Joel Lane in 1785. About 1824 the house underwent significant alterations that resulted in the Greek Revival dwelling that is today a house museum. Beginning in 1916, land south of the house was sold and subdivided for residential development. When the Mordecai family sold the land, it made multiple stipulations. The neighborhood was named in honor of the plantation, and only whites could live on most of the land (about eighteen acres near the railroad could either be sold for residences for African Americans or used for factories).

== Building styles ==
Mordecai Place was developed between about 1900 to the 1950s and includes notable examples of Colonial Revival, Classical Revival, Dutch Colonial Revival, Spanish Mission Revival, Tudor Revival, Italian Renaissance Revival and Bungalow / American Craftsman style architecture. Within the district is the Mordecai Historic Park, which includes the separately listed Mordecai House. Other notable buildings are the former Pilot School and the Pilot Baptist Church (c. 1917). There are also a few examples of a more typically rural vernacular style, the two-story, side-gabled I-house. Towards the middle of the twentieth century, smaller Cape Cods and Minimal Traditional houses were built.

== See also ==
- List of Registered Historic Places in North Carolina
- Mordecai House

== Bibliography ==
- National Register of Historic Places Nomination Form Retrieved 2012-06-20
