= Moses Mordecai =

Philadelphia merchant and broker (1707–1781)

- Born: 1707; Bonn, Electorate of Cologne
- Died: May 28, 1781; Philadelphia, Pennsylvania, U.S.
- Occupations: Merchant, broker
- Spouse: Elizabeth Whitlock
- Children: Jacob Mordecai
- Relatives: Alfred Mordecai (grandson)

Moses Mordecai (1707 – May 28, 1781) was a German-born Jewish merchant and broker in colonial Philadelphia. He was the founder of the Mordecai family in America, whose members included his son, the educator Jacob Mordecai, and his grandson, the army ordnance officer Alfred Mordecai.

== Life ==
Mordecai was born in Bonn in 1707. He came to America around 1750 and settled in Philadelphia, where he worked as a broker.

On October 25, 1765, he was one of the Philadelphia merchants who signed the Philadelphia non-importation agreement, pledging not to import British goods until the Stamp Act was repealed. According to the Jewish Encyclopedia, in 1777 he signed an agreement to accept paper currency in place of gold and silver.

He married Elizabeth Whitlock, an Englishwoman who converted to Judaism. Their son Jacob, born in Philadelphia in 1762, worked in the office of the merchant David Franks before moving to Warrenton, North Carolina, where he founded a well-known school for young women.

Mordecai died in Philadelphia on May 28, 1781.

== Widow's remarriage ==
After Mordecai's death, his widow sought to marry Jacob I. Cohen. Because she was a convert and Cohen was a kohen, who under Jewish law may not marry a convert, the question of whether Congregation Mikveh Israel's minister, Gershom Mendes Seixas, could perform the marriage became a matter of controversy. Mordecai Moses Mordecai, no relation, was one of three people asked to rule on it. They declared that the marriage could not take place, although it did, in 1782, outside the congregation.
