= Moti Nagar metro station =

Metro station in Delhi, India

Moti Nagar

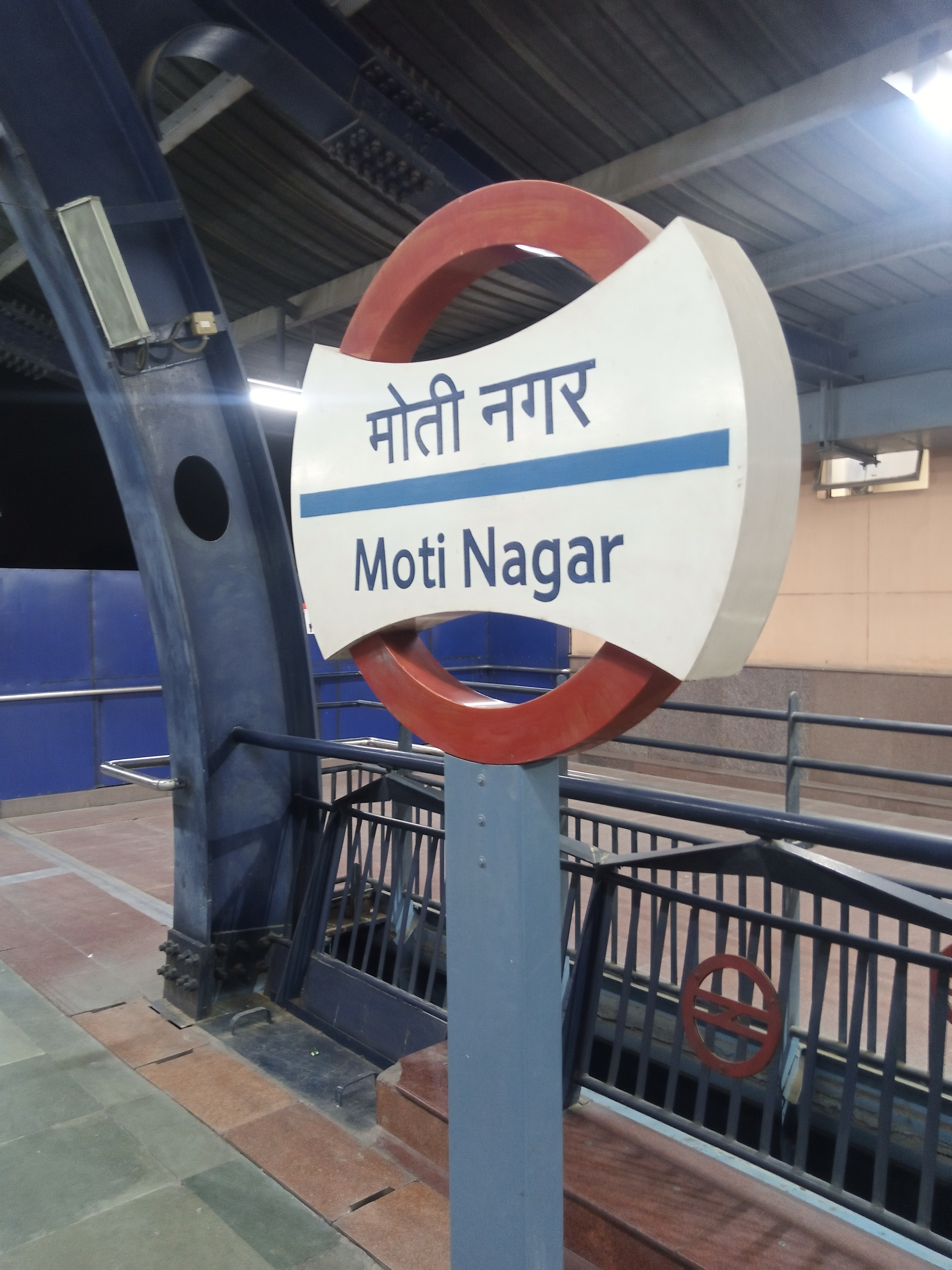

General information
- Location: Najafgarh Road, DLE Industrial Area, Kirti Nagar, Delhi, 110015
- Coordinates: 28°39′29″N 77°08′33″E
- System: Delhi Metro station
- Owner: Delhi Metro
- Operator: Delhi Metro Rail Corporation (DMRC)
- Line: Blue Line
- Platforms: Side platform; Platform-1 → Noida Electronic City / Vaishali; Platform-2 → Dwarka Sector 21
- Tracks: 2

Construction
- Structure type: Elevated, Double-track
- Platform levels: 2
- Parking: Available
- Accessible: Yes

Other information
- Status: Staffed, Operational
- Station code: MN

History
- Opened: 31 December 2005; 20 years ago
- Electrified: 25 kV 50 Hz AC through overhead catenary

Passengers
- Jan 2015: 18,336/day 568,421/ Month average

Services
Preceding station	Delhi Metro	Following station
Ramesh Nagar towards Dwarka Sector 21	Blue Line	Kirti Nagar towards Noida Electronic City or Vaishali
Route map
Location

The Moti Nagar metro station is located on the Blue Line of the Delhi Metro. It is very near to the famous "JhuleLal Mandir" in Moti Nagar (New Delhi).

== The station ==
=== Station layout ===
L2	Side platform | Doors will open on the left
L2	Platform 1 Eastbound	Towards → Noida Electronic City / Vaishali; Next Station: Kirti Nagar Change at the next station for Green Line
L2	Platform 2 Westbound	Towards ← Dwarka Sector 21; Next Station: Ramesh Nagar
L2	Side platform | Doors will open on the left
L1	Concourse	Fare control, station agent, Metro Card vending machines, crossover
G	Street Level	Exit/Entrance

== Entry/Exit ==
Moti Nagar metro station Entry/exits
Gate No-1	Gate No-2	Gate No-3	Gate No-4
Moti Nagar Market	Fun Cinema	Kalra Hospital	Kirti Nagar

== Connections ==
=== Bus ===
Delhi Transport Corporation bus routes number 108, 234, 308, 408, 408CL, 408EXTCL, 410, 410ACL, 410CL, 778, 801, 810, 813, 813CL, 816, 816A, 816EXT, 817, 817A, 817B, 820, 823, 832, 833, 841, 842, 847, 857, 871, 871A, 908, serves the station from outside metro station stop.

== See also ==
- Delhi
- List of Delhi Metro stations
- Transport in Delhi
- Delhi Metro Rail Corporation
- Delhi Suburban Railway
- Delhi Monorail
- Delhi Transport Corporation
- Central Delhi
- New Delhi
- National Capital Region (India)
- List of rapid transit systems
- List of metro systems
