= Temple Beth Elohim (Georgetown, South Carolina) =

Reform synagogue in South Carolina, United States

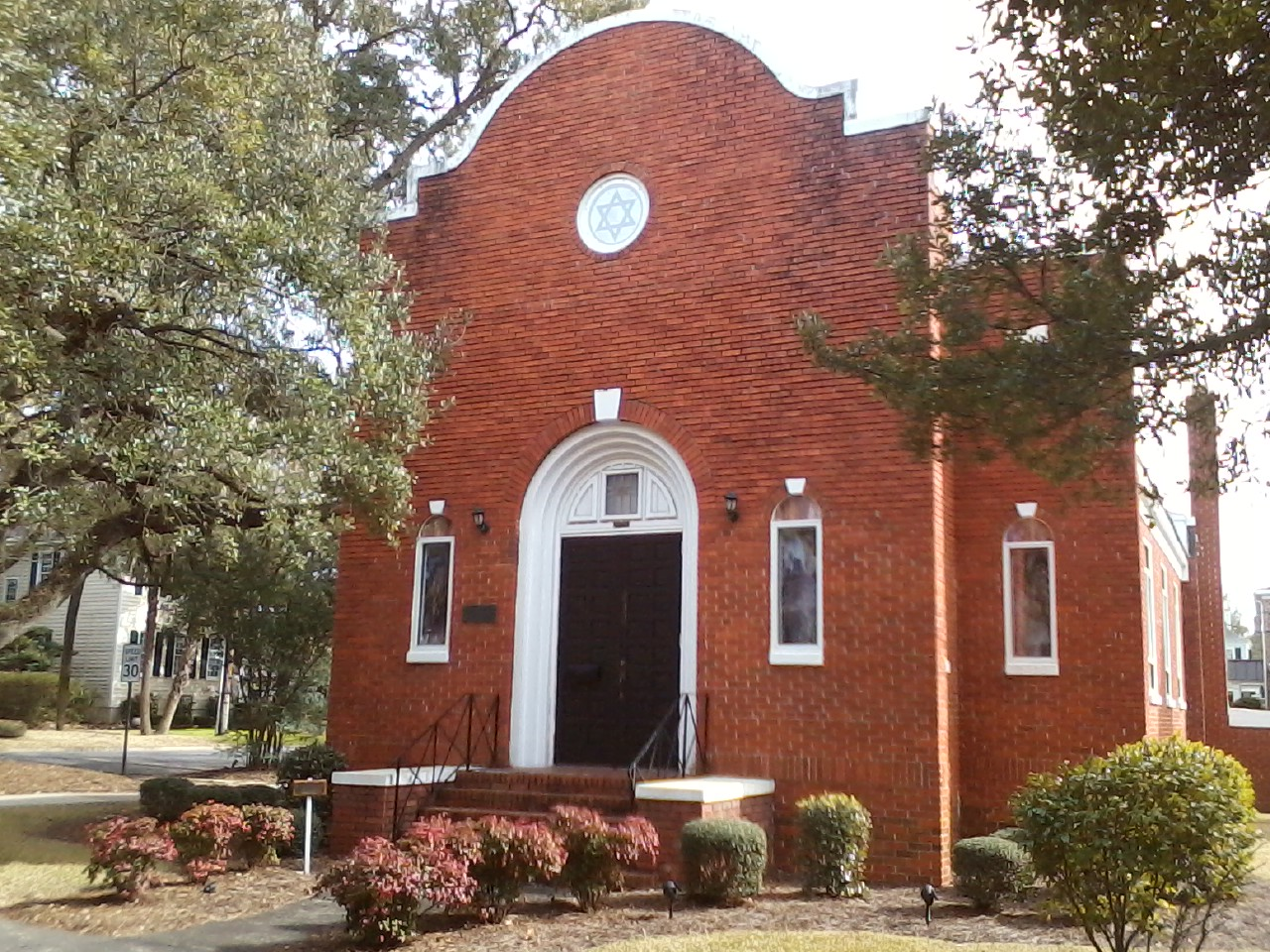
- Temple Beth Elohim synagogue in 2014

- Location in South Carolina

Religion
- Affiliation: Reform Judaism
- Ecclesiastical or organizational status: Synagogue
- Leadership: Lay led
- Status: Active

Location
- Location: 230 Screven Street, Georgetown, South Carolina
- Country: United States
- Interactive map of Temple Beth Elohim
- Coordinates: 33°22′03″N 79°16′49″W

Architecture
- Type: Synagogue
- Style: Romanesque Revival
- Established: 1904 (as a congregation)
- Completed: 1904; 1949
- Materials: Red brick

Website
- templebethelohim.net

Temple Beth Elohim is a Reform Jewish synagogue located at 230 Screven Street in Georgetown, South Carolina, in the United States.

== Early history ==
In the early 1760s, Abraham Cohen (1739–1800) and his younger brother Solomon Cohen Sr. (1757–1835), were the first Portuguese Jews (Sephardim) to arrive and settle in Georgetown (Parish) District, South Carolina. Moses Cohen (1709–1762) their father, emigrated to colonial America with a small group of impoverished Portuguese Jews, with eldest son Abraham age ten, circa 1750 from London, England into Charleston. Moses Cohen was the first religious leader of the small congregation of Jews, known as Kahal Kadosh Beth Elohim in Charlestown. They used old established Portuguese Rituals used in Bevis Marks, the place of worship for Sephardim in London.

Abraham Cohen and a small number of (Sephardim) Portuguese Jews "worshipped in each other's homes and also at the Winyah Indigo Society" in Prince George's Parish (Georgetown District). Cohen, the eldest child of Moses Cohen, was a Vendu-master, and he "lived on Prince Street … with Free Peggy (Margaret) McWharter (b. abt. 1745, d. 1806) a Free Person of Color," owned a Blacksmith shop and also served as first United States Postmaster. Abraham Cohen, along with his sister, Esther Cohen Myers, and her husband Mordecai Myers, are buried in Beth Elohim Cemetery, which Cohen "helped to establish in 1772, twenty-eight years before he was laid to rest there". However, the grave marker for younger brother, Solomon Cohen Sr., can be found in Chatham County, Georgia at Laurel Grove Cemetery. Solomon Cohen Jr. (1802–1875), his son, was the first Portuguese Jew born in Georgetown. He became a lawyer and later moved his widowed mother, Bella Moses Cohen, and wife, Miriam Gratz Moses, to Savannah, Georgia, c. 1840, around the time of the so-called "Organ Controversy," involving the installation of a musical organ and music in Kahal Kodosh Beth Elohim, then an Orthodox synagogue in Charleston.

Mordecai Myers, the husband of Esther Cohen Myers, and brother-in-law of Abraham Cohen, arrived in Georgetown (Parish) District about the same time. Abraham Cohen, Solomon Cohen Sr., and Mordecai Myers became prominent plantation owners in the colonial economy of Indigo, and growing rice, including auctioning and ownership of enslaved Kissi (Geechee) people from West Africa. For years they worshipped at home or the Winyah Indigo Society building.

== History ==
The constitution of Congregation Beth Elohim was signed on October 30, 1904, and the synagogue building opened in 1906. Temple Beth Elohim was not organized as a place of worship until 1904, more than one hundred years after Abraham Cohen was buried in Beth Elohim cemetery in Georgetown, alongside his sister, Esther, and her husband, Mordecai Myers.

The Temple Beth Elohim building and place of worship is located several blocks away from the historic Beth Elohim cemetery founded in 1772 by Abraham Cohen and others. The cemetery is directly across from the old Bethel African Methodist Episcopal Church, built after Emancipation.
