= Emma Mordecai =

Jewish educator and Confederate

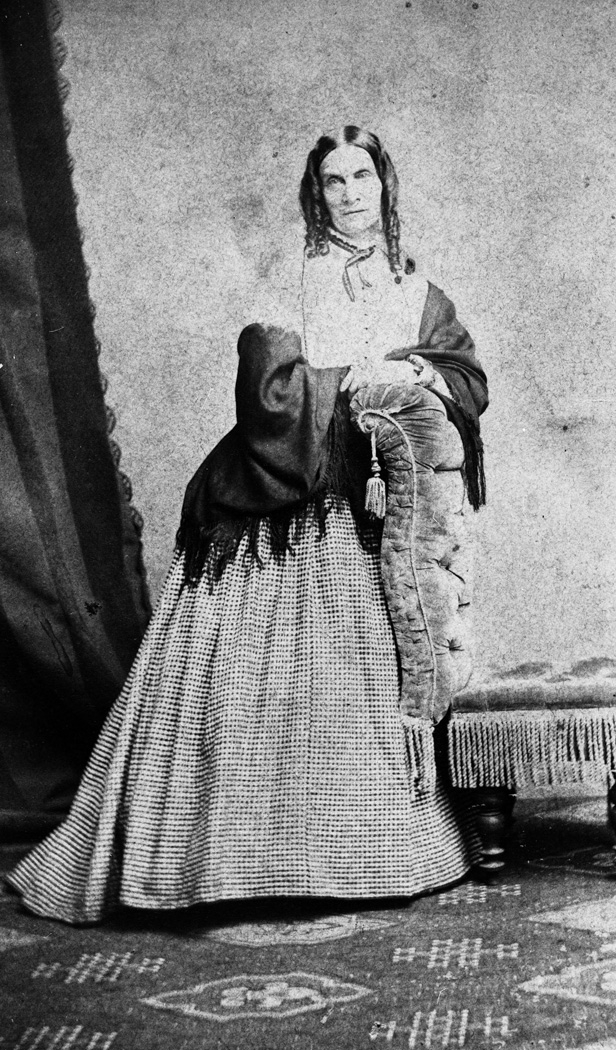
- Emma Mordecai, Richmond VA studio portrait (courtesy Mordecai House, Raleigh, NC). From General Negative Collection, State Archives of North Carolina.
- Born: October 6, 1812; North Carolina
- Died: April 8, 1906 (aged 93); Brevard, Transylvania County, North Carolina
- Occupation: educator
- Relatives: Jacob Mordecai (father); Moses Mordecai (grandfather)

Emma Mordecai (October 6, 1812 – April 8, 1906) was an American educator, diarist, slave owner, outspoken supporter of the Confederacy and the values of the Old South, and active member of the Jewish community in 19th-century Richmond, Virginia. While some members of her family had converted to Christianity, amidst a climate of antisemitism in the Civil War-era South, Mordecai remained an observant Jew her entire life. She devoted most of her life to educational and religious causes, founding the Jewish Sunday school at Congregation Beth Shalome of Richmond.

== Life ==
Emma Mordecai was born in 1812, one of thirteen siblings of the Mordecai family. Her father was Jacob Mordecai and her paternal grandfather was Moses Mordecai. Her mother was Rebecca Myers Mordecai, the second wife of Jacob, and the younger sister of Jacob's deceased first wife Judith. Mordecai's grandfather, Moses, was an Ashkenazi German Jew who married Esther (Elizabeth Hester Whitlock), an English-born convert to Judaism. Moses immigrated from Germany to London and later from London to Philadelphia.

Mordecai spent her formative years, ages seven to nineteen, living at the Spring Farm slave plantation near Richmond, Virginia. At age nineteen, her father sold the slave plantation and the Mordecai family moved into Richmond. Her family owned eighteen enslaved African-Americans, some of whom were sold, some of whom were hired out as contract laborers, and some of whom remained with the family in Richmond.

During the spring and summer of 1865, slaves owned by Mordecai living in Henrico County began to assert themselves after Richmond was captured by Union forces. Mordecai became increasingly frustrated by the unwillingness of her slaves to work or relocate, writing that "To have to submit to the Yankees is bad enough, but to submit to negro children is a little worse. They will, I hope, get ready to go soon." Several weeks later after she witnessed her slaves packing their bags she wrote again, "They will now begin to find out how easy their life as slaves has been, [and] to feel the slavery of their freedom." Having believed that her slaves reciprocated the love she was sure she had bestowed upon them, Mordecai was distraught that they would want to leave. While staying with her sister-in-law Rose, she expressed exasperation in her diary that a slave named Mary "took out of her bed, and never came back."

In her personal diary, she wrote prayers for the victory of the Confederacy and her own safety, documenting each day of her life. Mordecai's journals between 1864 and 1865 are preserved as part of the Mordecai family papers at the University of North Carolina at Chapel Hill.

Mordecai died at age 93 in Brevard, North Carolina, on 8 April 1906, surrounded by family. She is buried at the Hebrew Cemetery in Richmond.

== See also ==
- Hebrew Cemetery, Richmond, Virginia
- Kahal Kadosh Beth Shalome

== Bibliography ==
- Ashton, Dianne with Melissa R. Klapper, eds. The Civil War Diary of Emma Mordecai. New York University Press, 2024
