= Alfred Mordecai =

American army officer (1804–1887)

Major Alfred Mordecai
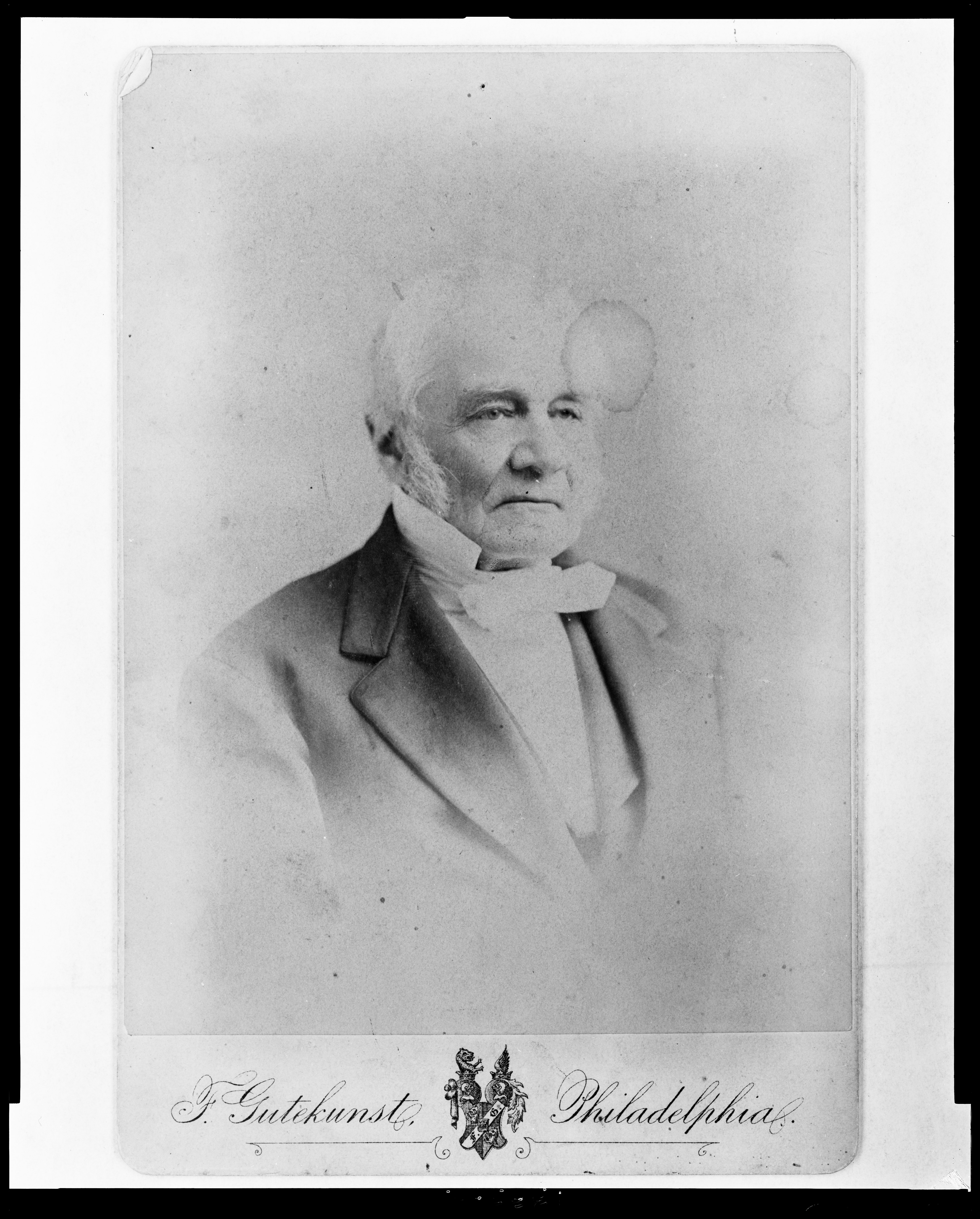
- Major Alfred Mordecai in 1880
- Born: January 3, 1804; Warrenton, North Carolina, U.S.
- Died: October 23, 1887 (aged 83); Philadelphia, Pennsylvania, U.S.
- Burial place: Federal Street Burial Ground
- Military career
- Branch: United States Army
- Service years: 1823–1861
- Rank: Major

Alfred Mordecai (January 3, 1804 – October 23, 1887) was an American army officer. He contributed to United States' military development through his research and writing, particularly in the area of artillery. He was instrumental in the United States' adoption of the M1857 12-pounder Napoleon. Mordecai served in a number of diplomatic missions for his country, but resigned at the start of the Civil War rather than fight for either side. He was one of the earlier Jewish Americans to choose the army as a career.

== Early and personal life ==
Mordecai was born in Warrenton, North Carolina, the son of Jacob Mordecai (1762–1838), who was in turn the son of Moses Mordecai (1707–1781), an Ashkenazi Jewish immigrant from Bonn. Alfred studied at the U.S. Military Academy at West Point, where he remained as an assistant professor after graduating top of his class.

Mordecai grew up in an Orthodox Jewish home, observing Shabbat and kashrut. As the only Jew at West Point, however, he was unable to maintain his religious practices and was forced to attend Presbyterian chapel every Sunday. Mordecai later became an agnostic and never returned to Judaism.

In 1836 Mordecai married Sara Ann Hays of Philadelphia, a niece of Rebecca Gratz. They had eight children. Sara was a practising Orthodox Jew and an abolitionist. In 1839 Mordecai set free a slave, Eugenia Hemings, who had once belonged to Thomas Jefferson. Mordecai had bought her in 1833, and she worked as his housekeeper and cook.

== Engineering work ==
He was commissioned in the U.S. Army Corps of Engineers and in 1825 he became assistant engineer in the construction of Fort Monroe and Fort Calhoun. In 1828 he was appointed assistant to the Chief of Engineers in Washington, D.C., and in 1833 he was placed in command of the Washington Arsenal.

In 1833, Mordecai joined the Ordnance Department. At the instruction of the Secretary of War, Lewis Cass, he prepared A Digest of the Laws Relating to the Military Establishment of the United States. He commanded the Frankford Arsenal from 1834 to 1838, after which he was appointed assistant to the Chief of Ordnance.

In 1840, he was a member of a commission sent by the Ordnance Board on a nine-month trip to Europe to visit arsenals and cannon foundries to report on the latest artillery improvements there. In 1841, he wrote The Ordnance Manual for the Use of Officers of the United States Army. This was "the first ever ordnance manual that standardized the manufacture of American weaponry with interchangeable parts, an essential step in the advancement of American mass manufacturing". A second edition was published in 1850.

Mordecai became assistant inspector of arsenals in 1842 and was engaged in constructing and experimenting with ballistic pendulums and gunpowder, with the idea of measuring muzzle velocity. His 1845 Report of Experiments on Gunpowder contains "an immense amount of research experimental material on gunpowder as it behaves in, or with, light and heavy artillery".

Mordecai was again placed in command of the Washington Arsenal in 1844 and later of the Watervliet Arsenal in 1857.

In 1849 he wrote Artillery for the United States Land Service which codified the American system of artillery, containing "complete drawings and descriptions of the different guns, howitzers, and mortars and their carriages that were in the Army's inventory."

== Diplomatic missions ==
In 1853 Mordecai was one of a small group selected by Secretary of War Jefferson Davis to travel to Mexico on a secret mission. Under the Treaty of Guadalupe Hidalgo, which ended the Mexican–American War, the U.S. government had agreed to indemnify American citizens for losses sustained through military action by the Mexican government. A dentist named George A. Gardiner has claimed almost $500,000 for the loss of a silver mine, which Mordecai proved did not exist. Gardiner was subsequently found guilty of fraud.

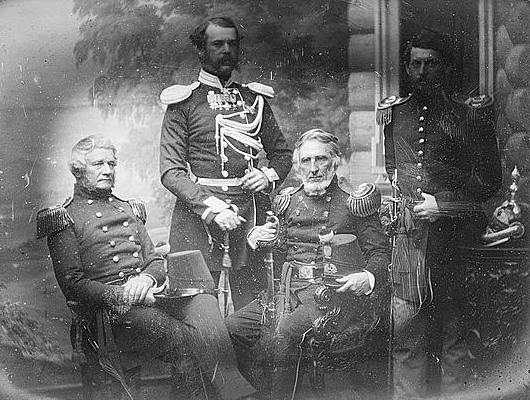
The Delafield Commission in Russia, c. 1855. Left to right: Alfred Mordecai, Lt. Colonel Obrescoff (Russian escort), Richard Delafield, and George B. McClellan

Mordecai was promoted to major in 1854. In 1855–57 he was sent, along with Major Richard Delafield and Captain George B. McClellan, as a member of a military commission to act as an observer during the Crimean War. His report, Military Commission to Europe, in 1855 and 1856, was published in 1860.

Mordecai praised the Canon obusier de 12 gun-howitzer, which soon afterward was manufactured in the United States as the M1857 12-pounder Napoleon. Alexander Rose notes that Mordecai's report is a "masterpiece of unbiased scholarship" but that he was curiously dismissive of repeaters and breechloaders. Instead, Mordecai emphasized marksmanship:

What mattered in a rifle, he believed, was its ability to allow a soldier to shoot his target at the longest distance possible and with the bare minimum of ammunition. To Mordecai, marksmanship was all, and in this he was adapting the historical American talent for fine shooting to the scientifically minded Victorian era.

In 1858, Mordecai was sent by President James Buchanan as a special diplomatic agent to Mexico.

== Civil War and retirement ==
With the advent of the Civil War in 1861, Mordecai was unwilling to fight either against the Confederacy or against his son, also called Alfred, who was serving in the Union Army. (Alfred Jr. remained in the army and retired in 1904 as a brigadier general.)

Having been denied a request to be transferred to California, Mordecai resigned his commission on May 5, 1861. He retired to private life, "dejected, broken-spirited and depressed". Rose notes that "Mordecai grieved for the North's abolitionist 'interference' in affairs below the Mason-Dixon Line, but he had 'no sympathy' with slavery and he was a good and faithful servant of the federal government." For this, he was criticized by people on both sides: on the Union side, he was charged (and acquitted) of "secretly selling arms and ordnance to the South", while on the Confederate side he was never reconciled to most of his southern family members.

Mordecai taught mathematics in Philadelphia until the war ended. After a brief stint in Mexico, where he worked as an assistant engineer for the Mexican Railway, Mordecai served as secretary and treasurer of the Pennsylvania Canal Company from 1867 until his death.

== Legacy ==
Mordecai was one the first Jewish Americans to choose the army as a lifetime career. Stanley L. Falk notes that Mordecai was "an active and outstanding participant in the development of American military technology." Falk also suggests that Mordecai's work was "valued for its accuracy, its precise and systematic nature, and its immediate usefulness. It was an example and an inspiration for every other worker in the same field, and Mordecai was respected by all of them for his technical contributions no less than he was loved for his fineness of character, integrity, warmth and gentle humor." According to The Jewish Press, Mordecai is best known for "introducing scientific methods into the development of pre-Civil War military munitions that contributed to America's becoming a nineteenth century world power." He has, however, been largely forgotten, and was not included in Webster's American Military Biographies edited by Robert McHenry.

Clarence Dutton assessed Mordecai's work as follows:

His memory is entitled in a peculiar degree to the care of army historians, for his work was such as appeals to technical and professional men rather than to the multitude. His contributions came, not in the shape of a few large nuggets, but in a steady stream of gold dust sustained for many years and far outweighing the nuggets in the end. The value of his work consisted in its accuracy, its systematic character, and its immediate utility, and still more in the subtle, potent way in which the spirit of it pervaded almost insensibly the entire corps.

Alexander Rose notes that

By preserving marksmanship as the quintessential American trait — a belief adopted by the nascent NRA from the 1870s onward — he can be counted as the spiritual father of such fine-shooting legends as the Springfield Model 1903 and the M1 Garand. It was a proud legacy for this unfairly obscure weaponry wizard.

In 1959, The Uncommon Soldier by Robert D. Abrahams, a fictionalized biography of Mordecai's life, was published by the Jewish Publication Society.

== Publications ==
- A Digest of the Laws Relating to the Military Establishment of the United States (1833)
- The Ordnance Manual for the Use of Officers of the United States Army (1841; second edition, 1850)
- Report of Experiments on Gunpowder, made at Washington Arsenal, in 1843 and 1844 (1845)
- Second Report of Experiments on Gunpowder, made at Washington Arsenal, in 1845, '47, and '48 (1849)
- Artillery for the United States Land Service, as devised and arranged by the Ordnance Board (1859)
- Military commission to Europe in 1855 and 1856 (1860)
