= Jacob Mordecai =

Jewish educator

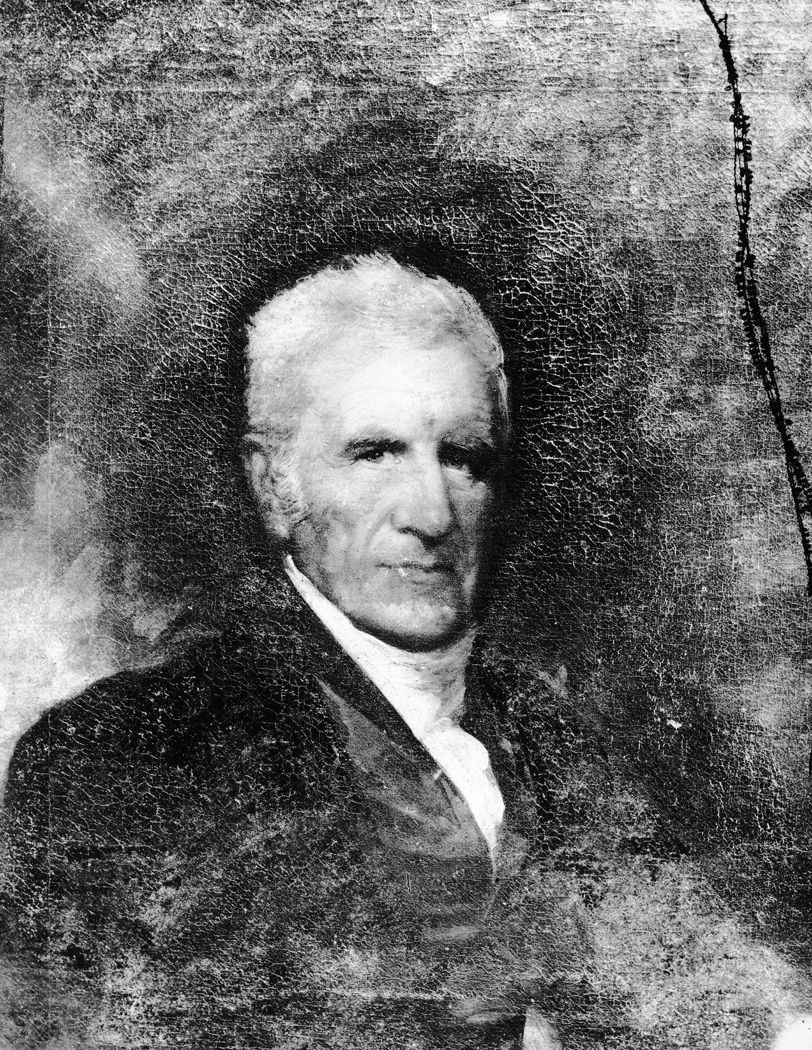
- Born: 11 April 1762; Philadelphia, Pennsylvania
- Died: September 4, 1838 (aged 76); Richmond, Virginia
- Occupation: Educator
- Relatives: Rachel Mordecai Lazarus (daughter); Alfred Mordecai (son); Emma Mordecai (daughter)

Jacob Mordecai (April 11, 1762 – September 4, 1838) was an educational pioneer in the early American Republic, having established the Warrenton Female Seminary, also known as Mordecai's Female Academy.

== Biography ==
Mordecai was the son of Moses, a German Jew who emigrated from Bonn to London, and Esther Mordecai (born Elizabeth Whitlock), an English-born convert to Judaism. His parents were observant Jews who in 1760 emigrated from London to Philadelphia. His parents chose to emigrate to Philadelphia because his father was a convict, one of several hundred Jewish convicts that the English authorities had encouraged to move to the American colonies. He attended private schools, receiving a classical education. At age 13, Mordecai served as a rifleman when the Continental Congress was resident in Philadelphia and later helped supply the Continental Army as a clerk to David Franks, the Jewish quartermaster to General George Washington.

After the war, Mordecai moved to New York City and married Judith Myers. In 1792, Judith and Jacob moved to Warrenton, North Carolina, a small town well situated on the roads linking Richmond, Charleston and Savannah. Though the Mordecais were the only Jewish family in and around this small town, they remained observant Jews, keeping a strictly kosher home where Shabbos was observed.

His wife, Judith, was a woman of delicate constitution who died at the time of the birth of her seventh child. Mordecai married Rebecca Myers, the younger half-sister of his first wife.

Mordecai first made his mark as a tobacco merchant in Warrenton. He was not, however, particularly interested in his business pursuits. He managed to obtain an excellent knowledge of Hebrew language and literature and studiously devoted himself to literary pursuits, especially biblical research, and wrote many scholarly articles.

Reversal of fortune made it necessary for him to give up his business, leaving him with the dilemma of how to support his large family. In the summer of 1808, some of the locals met with Jacob and offered to help support the establishment of an “academy” for girls, on the condition that he would become its headmaster. The influential town leaders regarded him highly for his learning and wisdom and were sure that he had the skills and temperament to be an effective teacher.

In 1809, the school opened with 30 students and quickly became a family project. In the beginning, Jacob and Rebecca taught all the classes. Soon they were joined in the classroom by their daughter Rachael and in later years by two of their sons. The younger Mordecai children helped with the cooking and care of the dormitories. The only instructor in the academy who was not a member of the family was the music teacher.

The school's curriculum was not limited to academics; it also stressed proper manners and demeanor. Students were subject to considerable personal discipline and a highly structured day. High standards of behavior and performance were the norm for both students and faculty. The goal was to properly mold both the character and intellectual development of the students.

The girls were required to wash their own utensils and maintain a high level of personal hygiene. Since the overwhelming majority of girls who attended the academy came from well-to-do homes in which they were pampered, some of them must have had trouble adjusting to the school's regimen.

Mordecai made sure that students attended the church of their choice. He was careful to avoid all doctrinal and sectarian discussions in school activities. At the same time he provided opportunities for all of his students to discuss philosophical and ethical issues.

Mordecai stressed that piety in any religious tradition was an important part of character development. The Mordecais included the observance of Jewish holidays in the academy's educational program. Since all of the Mordecai children, male and female, attended and/or worked in the school, as well as several cousins, there was a critical mass of Jewish students to observe holidays.

Mordecai encouraged the Christian students at the academy to observe their own religious holidays. To him it mattered little what religious practices his students observed, just so long as they were respectful of the religious preferences of others. There were discussions of philosophical texts that raised moral and ethical issues that all students could deal with regardless of their religious differences.

Given the above it is no wonder that within a few years the academy's excellent reputation had spread so quickly that by 1814 Mordecai was forced to cap enrollment at 110 students.

In 1819, at age 56, ten years after opening his Female Academy, Jacob Mordecai chose to sell the highly successful enterprise and move his family to Richmond, Virginia. He purchased the Spring Farm slave plantation and lived as an active member of Richmond's Jewish community, serving as president of its Congregation Kahal Kadosh Beth Shalome.

== See also ==
- Mordecai House
- Mordecai family
