= Daraganj =

- town
- Location in Uttar Pradesh, India
- Coordinates: 25°26′N 81°53′E
- Country: India
- State: Uttar Pradesh
- District: Prayagraj

Languages
  - Official: Hindi
- Time zone: UTC+5:30 (IST)
- PIN: 211006
- Telephone code: 0532250-
- Vehicle registration: UP-70
- Coastline: 0 kilometres (0 mi)
- Nearest city: kaushambi

Daraganj is a prominent suburb and a landmark in the city of Allahabad (Prayagraj). It is the oldest suburb of Prayag at the bank of celestial river Ganges and not far from Triveni Sangam – the confluence of three sacred rivers: the Ganges, Yamuna, and the third invisible river Saraswati. Daraganj is a theoretical and philosophical reference point of a city now called Prayagraj.

== Location ==
Situated on the bank of the river Ganges, Daraganj is cosmopolitan with a mix of Punjabi, Bengali, Marathi, Tamil, Telugu, Kannad, and Gujarati communities living within a small area aside from natives. As a small village, Daraganj has a mesh of narrow lanes without any road signs, all leading into the main road. This is the last bathing Ghat on the river Ganges before it joins the river Yamuna. The name "Daraganj" is presumably derived from the word Dharaganj, meaning the place of the stream or current of water. There is also a legend that it is named after Dara Shikoh, the elder brother of Mughal king Aurangjeb who was subsequently killed by Aurangjeb in the power struggle for the throne. Dara Shikoh was known to have studied Hindu scriptures and translated many of the Upanishads and Puranas into Persian. The translation work presumably had taken place at Daraganj.

== Religious significance ==
Prayagraj is the main pilgrimage center because Lord Brahma conducted first (pra) ten yajnas (yag) there at Dashaswamedh Ghat, also being located in Daraganj. Assuming Lord Brahma lives one hundred celestial years – equivalent to 311.04 trillion earth years, and that it is currently the fifty-fifth year of Brahma, and that Brahma performed the first ten Yajnas when he was twenty years of age, it can be considered to happen 110 trillion years ago. "Lord Brahmā's day, consisting of his 12 hours, lasts 4 billion 320 million years, and his night is of the same duration." (Śrīmad Bhāgavatam 12.8.2-5) The area has numerous Hindu temples, such as the Dashaswamedh Temple, Veni-Madhav Temple, Naag-Vasuki Temple, "Bhishma Shaiya", Bade Hanumaanji Temple, and Sri Jagannath Temple. Next to Daraganj is the "Alopi Devi Mandir", It is a temple dedicated to "Mother Sati", the wife of Lord Shiva. The story as told in Puranas suggests that the Alopi Temple was the place where the last remains of Mother Sati fell, when Shiva was sadly carrying them around the world. To bring Lord Shiva out of his mourning, Lord Vishnu threw his "Chakra" at the remains causing the remains to drop at various places on the earth. The last piece of the remains dropped at this place. Hence the place came to be known as "Alopi" meaning disappearance (of remains).

Lord Rama visited Prayag twice. The first stay was at Bharadwaj Ashram which still exists near the University of Allahabad. Lord Rama, Sita, and Lakshmana visited the Veni Madhav Temple during their fourteen-year-long exile and it was at Daraganj where "Nishad", the king of boatsmen, helped them cross the Ganges river. After killing Ravana, the "Pushpak Viman" carrying Lord Rama, Lakshman, Hanuman, and the victorious army of monkeys and bears stopped over at Prayag again where Lord Rama and Lakshman did "prayashchit" for having killed Brahmanas. NASA photographs of the bridge made of boulders between Sri Lanka and India predict it to be 1.7 million years old.

A famous debate between Shankaracharya and Mandan Mishra and his learned wife Bharati Mishra took place in 700 AD – Bharati Mishra was the judge. When the couple lost the philosophical debate and was about to enter alive in the pyre – according to "rules of engagement" in those days – Shankaracharya granted them pardon and right to live, and preach Vedic knowledge rather than Buddhism.

About 500 years ago, Lord Chaitanya preached the essential principals of devotion to Rupa Goswami for ten days at Dashaswamedh Ghat. There is a plaque bearing the historic marking "Rupa Shikshsthali" at Dashaswamedh Ghat. Another plaque bearing the footprints of Chaitanya Mahaprabhu is located near at Veni Madhava Temple, where Lord Chaitanya used to sing and dance every day. Lord Chaitanya stayed for three nights at "Naag Vasuki" Mandir.

About 500 years ago, Mirabai visited Daraganj and composed a famous devotional poem "chalo man Ganga Yamuna teer". In 483 AD, the Moghul Emperor Akbar named Prayag as Ilahabad – City of God – also called Prayagraj. The founder of Arya Samaj Dayanand Saraswati also stayed at "Naag Vasuki" Mandir for three nights.

== Notable residents ==
- Suryakant Tripathi Nirala – Hindi poet and writer
- Ravindra Khattree – statistician and distinguished professor

== Education ==
Radha Raman Inter College is an intermediate college located in front of Daraganj Railway Station and behind Prayag Ghat (now renamed Prayagraj Sangam) Railway Station.

Other colleges include Maa Saraswati Inter College, Nirala Balika Vidyalaya, Navbharti Public School, Royal House Public School, Handia Baba Inter College, and Modern Nursery Primary School (1982–2000).

== Festivals ==
Daraganj is also a place known for festivals. One can see a festival every 15 days. These festivals are of native types which are celebrated mainly in Daraganj and other few places. Some of these include Vata Savitri, Ganga Dussehra, Dhendia, Bhai Duj, Parewa, Bada Ittwaar etc. Naag Panchami Mela at Naag Vasuki Temple in Daraganj is a unique festival where along with worshipping thousands of serpents, masses participate in shopping for fun and sing songs.

== Transport ==
National Highway 19 (NH 19; previously NH2), runs through the middle of the Daraganj via Shashtri Bridge which links it to Allahabad and Varanasi.

City buses, Tourist taxis, auto rickshaws (or tempos) are available for local transport. There are also city buses service run by UPSRTC as well as private operators that connects various parts of the city, but the most convenient method of local transport inside the city is the E-rickshaw and cycle rickshaw.

Daraganj and Prayag Ghat Terminus (now renamed Prayagraj Sangam) are railway stations that face each other, although Daraganj station is at a much higher level than ground level, thereby providing easier passage for trains to the bridge over the river Ganga.
