= Kingdom of Tazeroualt =

Kingdom of Tazeroualt Tageldit n Tazerwalt (Tachelhit)
- 1613–1681
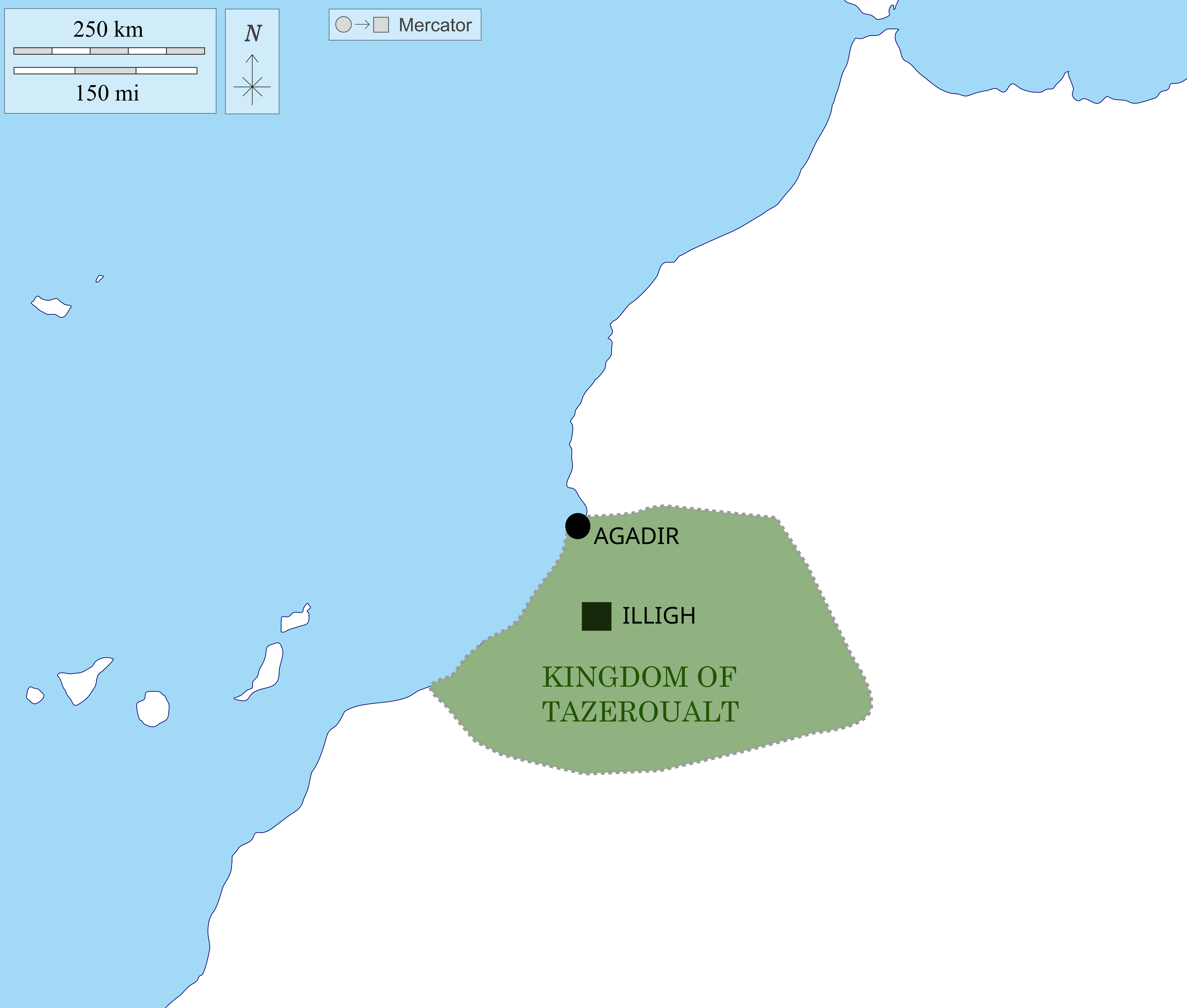
- Status: Kingdom or principality
- Capital: Illigh
- Common languages: Tachelhit
- Religion: Sunni Islam
- Emir
  - 1613-1659: Ali Budmia
- History
  - Established: 1613
  - Disestablished: 1681
Preceded by	Succeeded by
Saadians	Alawi Sultanate
- Today part of: Morocco

The Kingdom of Tazeroualt (Tachelhit: Tageldit n Tazerwalt, Arabic: إمارة إيليغ) or Zaouia of Illigh, was a principality based on a Sufi brotherhood of Sous, in Morocco, founded by Ali Abu Hassun al-Simlali at the beginning of the 17th century.

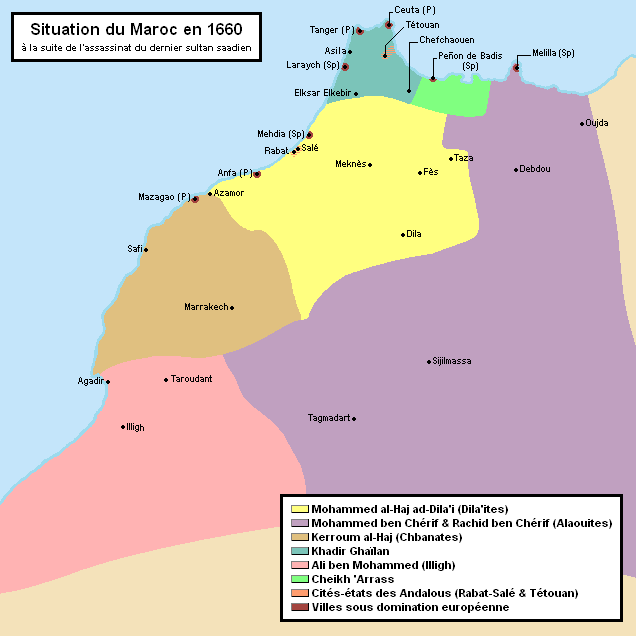
State of fragmentation of Morocco (17th century) after the assassination of the last Saadian sultan

== History ==
=== Rise to power ===
Following the accession to the throne of Sultan Zaydan at the beginning of the 17th century, the weakened Saadian Makhzen enjoyed only limited power. Several forces then appeared, including the zaouia of Tazeroualt and the Alawis, the future ruling dynasty:

- The zaouia of Dila, exercising its control over central Morocco;
- The plains of the northwest, controlled by the marabout al-Ayachi and his allies;
- The mouth of the Bou Regreg, erected as an independent state by the Moriscos;
- Tetouan, a city-state governed by the Naqsis family;
- Tafilalt, under the control of the Alawis;
- Southern Morocco, under the control of the zawiya of Illigh.

Ali Abu Hassun (Abu Dami'a) al-Simlali, great-grandson of the great mystic and founder of the Zawiya of Illigh Sidi Ahmed Ou Moussa, became the head of the zawiya in 1613. After Ahmed ibn Abi Mahalli was defeated in 1614, Abu Hassun mobilized the Sous Berbers, particularly the Jazula tribe, to oppose the weakened Sultan Zaydan. Abu Hassun repeatedly clashed with Yahya al-Hahi, the Sultan’s protector from the High Atlas, who had relocated to Taroudant after 1614 to challenge Abu Hassun for control of the Sous region.

Following al-Hahi's death in 1626 and the subsequent collapse of his principality, Iligh was established as the capital of Sous, making Abu Hassun al-Simlali its ultimate authority. He rapidly expanded his territory into the Draa valley and seized Sijilmasa in 1631, holding it until the Alawis expelled him in 1640. Ultimately, Abu Hassun secured his state’s financial stability and acquired European weapons by dominating the lucrative trans-Saharan trade routes. The territory under its control, the "kingdom of Tazeroualt", then represented the obligatory passage of the trans-Saharan gold traffic on the Gao-Timbuktu-Taroudant axis.

In 1631, Abu Hassun al-Simlali garrisoned at the Tabua'samt fortress, prompting the Dila zaouia to send an army a year later to reinstate their allies, the Banu Zubayr. In response, the local religious leaders recognized the Alawi Mawlay al-Sharif as sultan to defend the oasis. Around 1635 or 1636, Mawlay al-Sharif unsuccessfully attempted to drive out Abu Hassun's troops, leading to his capture and exile to Sous. Though imprisoned for most of his remaining years, he was treated well by Abu Hassun, who presented him with an enslaved woman; she later gave birth to two sons, one being the future sultan, Mawlay Ismail.

=== Decline ===
The zaouia of Illigh, from the second half of the 17th century onwards, lost ground to the Alawi dynasty, who eventually extended their power over all of Morocco. Mawlay al-Rashid destroyed the fortress of Iligh in 1681 which brought an end to Tazeroualt's political power, and dispersed Abu Hassun's heirs into the Sahara.

Political power in Tazeroualt was revived in Iligh at the end of the 18th century by the family of Abu Dami'a under Hashim ibn 'Ali (d. 1825) and, by his son Husayn (d. 1886). Utilising the mawsims and a growing Jewish community in Iligh to conduct trade, Tazeroualt became the most important commercial hub in south-western Morocco, linking European commerce from the port of Essaouira with the trans-Saharan trade. Although recognising the sovereignty and the spiritual authority of the 'Alawi sultans over all Morocco, Tazeroualt constituted a virtually independent maraboutic principality until the late 19th century.

However, the zaouia would retain a local influence until the 19th century, when Sultan Hassan I managed to subdue Illigh in 1882. Tazeroualt was finally subdued at the beginning of the 20th century. Having been definitively subdued at the beginning of the 20th century, Tazeroualt no longer had any political or economic impact.

== Bibliography ==
- Institut des hautes-études marocaines; Victor), Justinard (Commandant, Léopold (1954). Un petit royaume berbère, le Tazeroualt: Un saint berbère, Sidi Ahmed Ou Moussa (in French). G.-P. Maisonneuve.
