= Abu Abdallah Mohammed al-Murabit al-Dila'i =

Moroccan writer

- أبو عبد الله محمد المرابط الدلائي
- Title: Al-Murabit

Personal life
- Born: Abu Abdallah Mohammed al-Hajj ibn Mohammed ibn Mohammed ibn Abd-al-Rahman ibn Abu Bakr al-Dilai Fez, Morocco
- Died: 1678
- Notable work(s): Al-Rihla al-Mujaddasa, Al Kitab Zawahir al-Fikri, Zahr al-hada'ih, Al-Zahr al-nadi fi-l-khuluk al-muhammadi, Durrat al-tidjan
- Known for: Renowned linguist, Scholar of Arabic grammar and usul-al-fiqh (law)
- Occupation: Scholar, Linguist
- Relatives: Abu Bakr ibn Mohammed al-Majati as-Sanhaji (grandfather), Mohammed al-Hajj (brother)

Abu Abdallah Mohammed al-Hajj ibn Mohammed ibn Mohammed ibn Abd-al-Rahman ibn Abu Bakr al-Dilai (Arabic: أبو عبد الله محمد المرابط الدلائي; d. 1678), also known as Al-Murabit, was a renowned linguist and scholar of Arabic grammar and usul-al-fiqh (law). He was the grandson of the founder of the zaouia of Dila, Abu Bakr ibn Mohammed al-Majati as-Sanhaji (1526-1612) and brother of Mohammed al-Hajj (died 1661), who proclaimed himself Sultan of Fez in 1659. Al-Dila'i wrote (a.o.) treatises on law (Al Kitab Zawahir al-Fikri), poems in praise of Muhammad (Zahr al-hada'ih and Al-Zahr al-nadi fi-l-khuluk al-muhammadi). And an urdjuza (poem in a specific meter) about the Shurafa, Durrat al-tidjan. Al-Dila'i performed the Hajj, along with his father, in 1659 and wrote his Rihla (account of the journey) in the form of a poem of 136 lines, entitled Al-Rihla al-Mujaddasa. He was the teacher of Abu Ali al-Hassan al-Yusi (1631–1691).
