= Zawiya Dila'iya =

Sufi brotherhood in Morocco

Zawiya Dila'iya الزاوية الدلائية (Arabic) Ayt Idilla (Berber languages)
- 1637–1668
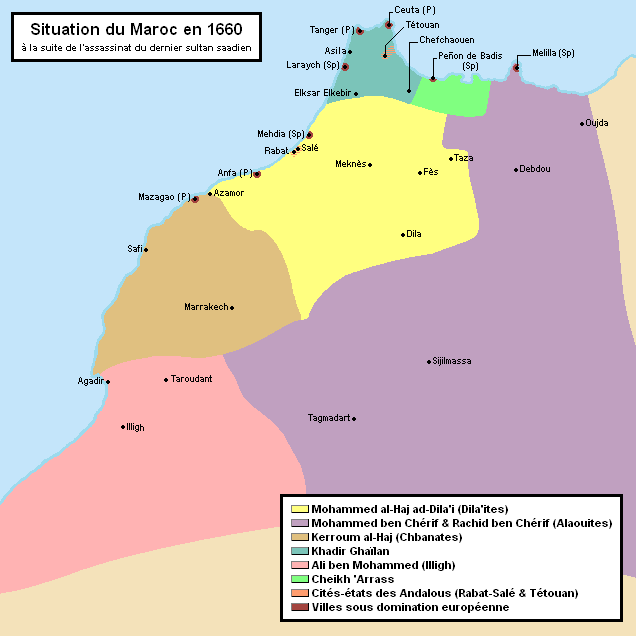
- State of fragmentation of Morocco after the assassination of the last Saadian sultan (Zawia of Dila in yellow)
- Status: Ruling dynasty of Morocco (1659–1663)
- Capital: Dila, Ait Ishaq
- Common languages: Arabic; Berber
- Religion: Sunni Islam
- Sheikh, later Sultan
  - 1637–1668: Mohammed al-Hajj
- Historical era: Middle Ages
  - Rebellion: 1637
  - 'Alawite annexation: 1668
Preceded by	Succeeded by
Saadi Sultanate	Alawi Sultanate
- Today part of: Morocco

The Zawiya Dila'iya (Arabic: الزاوية الدلائية, Berber languages: Ait Idilla), also known as the Zawiya of Dila and the Dila'iya Sultanate, was a Sufi brotherhood, centred in the Middle Atlas range of Morocco.

== History ==
=== Origins ===
There were originally two zawiyas referred to as Dila'. The first zawiya was founded by Abu Bakr ibn Muhammad al-Majjati al-Sanhaji (1537–1612), a Sanhaja Berber of the Aït Mejjat tribe, a branch of the Ait Idrassen confederation. He was a follower of the famous Sufi mystic Muhammad al-Jazuli, who founded the Jazuliyya branch of the Shadhiliyya order. This first zawiya was established towards 1566 and located near the qsur of M'ammar, about 10 kilometres southeast of Ait Ishaq (in today's Khenifra Province). Under the leadership of Muhammad ibn Abu Bakr, the brotherhood was able to establish itself in the Berber territory of the Middle Atlas and High Atlas mountain ranges. The zawiya was initially supported by the ruling Saadi dynasty, who were themselves partisans of the Jazuliyya.

As the Saadi State in Morocco declined and descended into disorder, the Dila'iyya Zawiya grew in both wealth and political prominence, providing refuge to students leaving the traditional urban centres and accumulating its own rich library. In 1638, under the leadership of Abu Bakr's grandson Mohammed al-Hajj, a second zawiya was founded at present-day Ait Ishaq to serve as an expanded headquarters for the organization. This new site, which had its own walls, mosques, and palaces, announced the zawiya's rising power and its growing political rivalry with the Saadi State.

=== Rise to power ===
Following the period of anarchy which followed the death of the Sultan Ahmad al-Mansur in 1603 and the accession to the throne by Moulay Zidan in 1613, several regions of Morocco escaped the control of the central Saadi State:

- the Sus, until Draa River, under the control of the Zaouia of Illigh by Abu al-Hassan Ali ben Mohammed al-Susi Essemlali;
- the plains of the northwest, from the Atlantic coast to Taza, controlled by the marabout al-Ayashi;
- the Republic of Salé, erected as an independent state by the Moriscos;
- Tétouan, city-state governed by the Naqsis family;
- the Tafilalt, under the control of the Alawites.

The Zawiya of Dila' then appeared, under the impetus of Mohammed al-Hajj, since its foundation, as a movement combining spirituality and politics, mixing the ideology of holiness and sharifism with aspirations for power by the Berbers. It took advantage of the weakness of Saadi power and the fragmentation of the country to extend its influence and control over several towns and regions in the north and center of Morocco. From 1637 onwards, the brotherhood started with the conquest of large parts of northern Morocco. By 1641, they had conquered Meknes, Fez and the port of Salé; from where a rival marabout, al-Ayashi, was expelled to the Khlout tribe, and assassinated on 30 April 1641. This was followed by the occupation of the rest of the important towns of northern Morocco including Tétouan. In Fez, the Saadi family was expelled and Mohammed al-Hajj was proclaimed Sultan.

=== Apogee ===
The Zawiya of Dila reached its peak in the middle of the 17th century, after having ordered the assassination of al-Ayashi in 1641, expanding its influence on the cities of Fez, Tétouan and Ksar el-Kebir and on the Republic of Salé, as well as on the plains of the north-west and the corridor of Taza to the Moulouya. Mohammed al-Hajj, head of the zawiya, thus governed Fez since 1641 This time was particularly difficult for the Jewish community of Fes, who through institutions such as Tujjar as-Sultan, had important ties with the Sharifi Saadi Makhzen. A Jewish chronicle of the time refers to Mohammed al-Hajj as the "sodomite of the zawiya" and recounts that in 1646 synagogues were ordered to close and were subsequently desecrated, damaged, or destroyed. The city was not receptive to the Dila either, and for a brief period in 1651 they rebelled and invited Muhammad ibn Muhammad al-Sharif, one of the early Alawite Sultans, to take control of the city. But the Dila'iya chief could still bring the town to submission by force. Muhammad Al Hajj placed a son, Abdullah, as governor of Salé. Following the death of the last Saadi sultan Ahmad al-Abbas in 1659, Mohammed al-Hajj was proclaimed Sultan of Morocco in Fez.

=== Decline ===
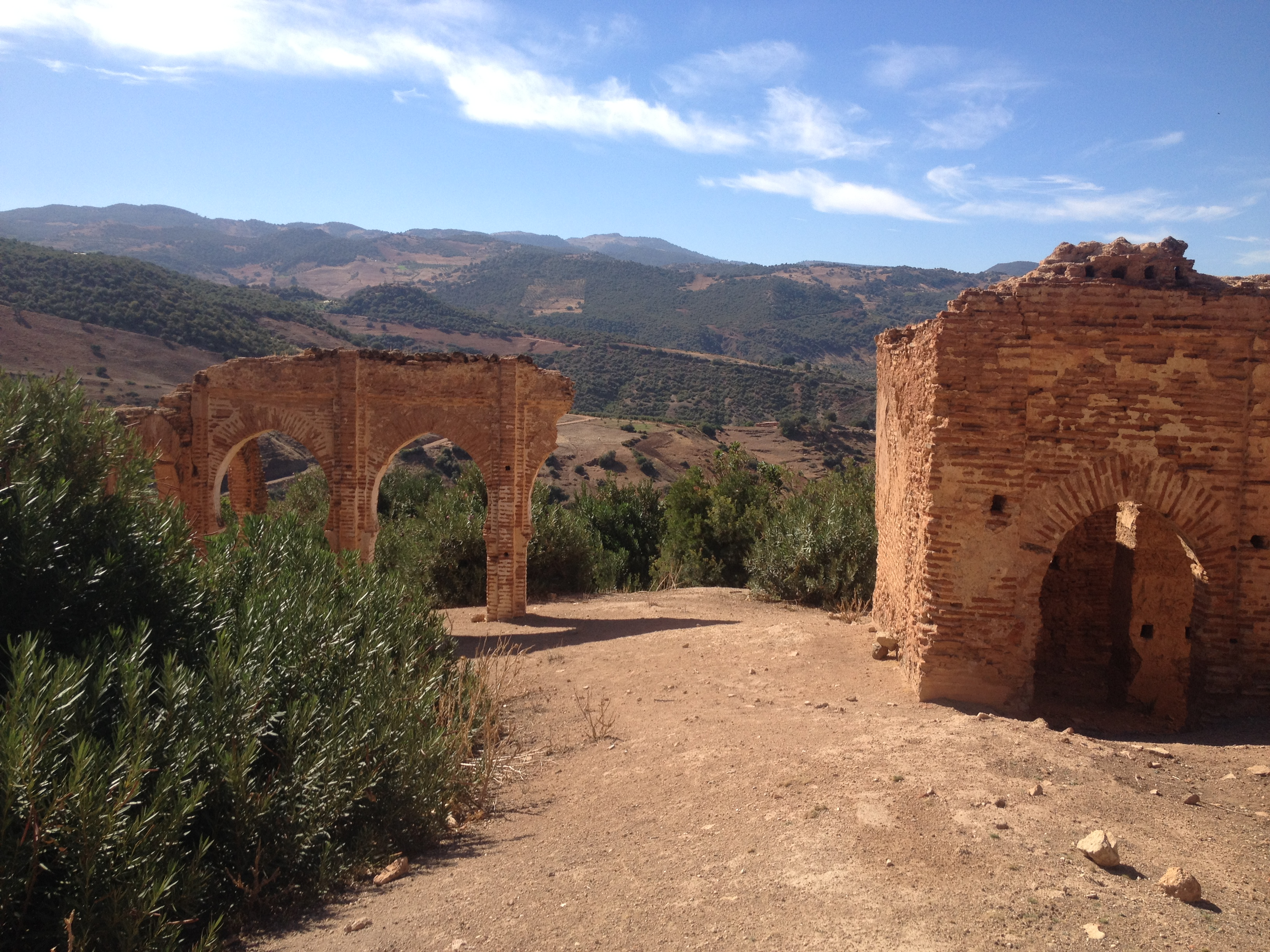
Ruins of Dila, Ait Ishaq

In 1660 Salé rose against the Dila'iya governor and was lost the following year. The Zawiya of Dila lost Fez in 1662 following the putsch of Qaid Al-Doraidi and a series of rebellions and counter-rebellions. Mohammed al-Hajj declined the appeal of the leaders of old Fez to impose direct order in 1663 and retreated to the highland capital. The Dila'ites ruled over central and northern Morocco until 1668, when Dila' itself was annexed by the shurafa Alawites, after their initial conquest of Fez. The immediate family of Mohammed al-Hajj was exiled to Tlemcen, while the rest of the Dilaiya notables took refuge in Fez. The Alawites spared the lives of his erstwhile hosts but assured the complete destruction of their political base.

In 1677, Ahmad ibn Abdullah, a grandson of Mohammed al-Hajj, returned with the support of the Turkish regime in Algeria and rallied the Idrassen and the other Sanhaja against the tribes of the Tadla which were in alliance with the Sultan. Three successive government expeditions were defeated by the reconstituted Dila coalition, until Ismail ibn Sherif himself, occupied at the time with revolts in Marrakesh and the Tafilalt, led his troops and overcame the highland forces. The Dilaite contender remained in the region until 1680, when he disappeared mysteriously.

== See also ==
- Balthazar of Loyola
