= Mohammed al-Hajj ibn Mohammed al-Dila'i =

Head of the Zaouia of Dila, proclaimed Sultan of Morocco in 1659

Mohammed al-Hajj al-Dila'i

Sultan of Morocco
- Reign: 1659–1662
- Predecessor: Ahmad al-Abbas (Saadi dynasty)
- Successor: Moulay Rachid (Alaouite dynasty)
- Born: Unknown
- Died: 1662
Names
- Mohammed al-Hajj bin Mohammed bin Abu Bakr al-Dila'i
- House: Dilaite
- Father: Sidi Mohammed al-Dila'i
- Religion: Sunni Islam

Mohammed al-Hajj ibn Mohammed ibn Abu Bakr al-Dila'i (Arabic: محمد الحاج الدلائي; died 1662) was the head of the Zaouia of Dila and conquered Meknes and Fez in 1641. He was proclaimed Sultan of Morocco in 1659, after the murder of the last Saadi Sultan Ahmad al-Abbas.

== Life ==
Mohammed al-Hajj is the grandson of the founder of the zaouia Abu Bakr ibn Mohammed (1526–1612), the son of Sidi Mohammed (died 1636) and brother of the scholar Abu Abdallah Mohammed al-Murabit al-Dila'i (died 1678). Mohammed al-Hajj is from the Middle Atlas, where was located their seat the Zaouia of Dila. He is from the Aït Mejjat tribe (Ait Idrassen), of Sanhaja Amazigh origins.

Some historical chronicles confuse him to be the one who brought the doom of the Zaouia of Dila, stating Mohammed al-Hajj was overthrown in 1663 when its zawiyya lost Fes. He is also confused to be the one who was defeated by the Alaouite Sultan Moulay Rachid in 1668.

During Al Haj's occupation of Fes, antisemitism in the city grew. A Jewish chronicle of the time recounts that in 1646 he ordered synagogues to close, and these were subsequently desecrated, damaged, or destroyed.

Mohammed al-Hajj died in 1662. Prior to his death, in 1660, he defeated Khadir Ghaïlan on the battlefield. The two armies had clashed for delimitation of rural frontiers. While the battle was a victory for the Dilaites over Ghaïlan, the victorious party suffered considerable casualties.

The doom of the Zaouia of Dila was not caused by their own ill making, but rather due to the 1662 rebellion in Fez of Caid Abdallah Al Doraidi who took advantage of news Mohammed al-Hajj's death, and proclaimed himself Sultan of Fez. The rebel, one of their troops commander, purposefully acted in an unfavorable time for the Dilaites, they were still recovering from their previous battle and thus struggled to gain back their full forces. The deceased's son Abdallah ould Mohammed al-Hajj tried to gain back Fez in 1663 but failed. He came with Berber contingents, besieged the city and camped below Fes el Bali's walls. The fighting lasted for ten days but faced with the city's fortifications, the Dilaites retreated.
