= Abu Marwan Abd al-Malik II =

9th Ruler of Saadi Dynasty

Saadi Sultant
- Reign: 1627 – 1631
- Predecessor: Zidan Abu Maali
- Successor: Al Walid ben Zidan
- Born: Saadi Sultanate
- Died: 10 March 1631; Saadi Sultanate
- Abu Marwan Abd al-Malik II bin Zidan Abu Maali
- Dynasty: House of Saadi
- Father: Zidan Abu Maali
- Religion: Sunni Islam

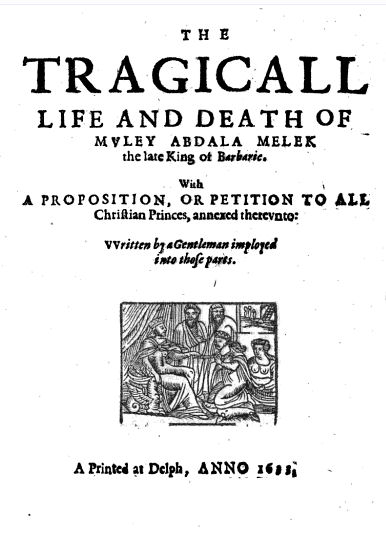
A book on Abd al-Malik, written by the English diplomat John Harrison in 1633.

Abu Marwan Abd al-Malik II ibn Zidan (Arabic: عبد الملك بن زيدان), also known as Abd el-Malik II (? – 10 March 1631) was the Saadi Sultan from 1627 to 1631.

== Life ==
After the expeditions of Isaac de Razilly to the territories within present-day Morocco, he signed a Franco-Moroccan treaty with France in 1631, giving France preferential treatment, known as Capitulations: preferential tariffs, the establishment of a consulate, and freedom of religion for French subjects.

The story of his life was published by the English diplomat John Harrison in 1633. He was succeeded by his brother Al Walid ben Zidan.

== Notes ==
Preceded by Zidan al-Nasir	Saadi Sultan; 1627–1631	Succeeded by Al Walid ben Zidan
