= Ahmad al-Abbas =

12th & Last Ruler of Saadi Dynasty

Saadi Sultan
- Reign: 1653 – 1659
- Predecessor: Mohammed esh-Sheikh es-Seghir
- Successor: Mohammed al-Hajj al-Dila'i (Dilaite interlude)
- Born: Saadi Sultanate
- Died: c. 1659; Saadi Sultanate
- Burial: c. 1659; Saadian Tombs
- Issue: Lalla Ruqyah
Names
- Ahmad al-Abbas bin Mohammed esh-Sheikh es-Seghir
- House: Saadi Dynasty
- Father: Mohammed esh-Sheikh es-Seghir
- Religion: Sunni Islam

Ahmad al-Abbas (Arabic: أحمد العباس) (? – 1659) was the last Sultan of the Saadi dynasty. He was proclaimed Sultan in Marrakesh in the year H.1064 (CE November 22, 1653 - November 11, 1654) after the death of his father, Mohammed esh-Sheikh es-Seghir. In 1659, he was assassinated by his maternal uncle, Abdul Karim Abu Bakr Al-Shabani. His uncle assumed power as Sultan in Marrakesh until 1667 when he was in turn murdered; it happened shortly before the Alaouite Sultan Moulay Al-Rashid of the current ruling dynasty conquered the city in 1668.

== Life ==
In 1659, Ahmed al-Abbas witnessed his capital Marrakesh besieged by his maternal uncle, Abdul Karim Abu Bakr Al-Shabani who was his General of armies. Al Shabani was of the Chabanate, an Arab Maqil tribe. The siege lasted many months. As the situation was worsening, Sultan Ahmed al-Abbas's mother thought it was a good idea for her son to go meet his uncle, and make peace with him and the Chabanate. He followed his mother's counsel, but he had just gone out of the city to meet his uncle when the latter traitorously murdered him.

Abdul Karim Abu Bakr Al-Shabani after having murdered his nephew Sultan Ahmed al-Abbas, proclaimed himself Sultan and locked up the deceased's wives and children in a tower. Among the royal ladies he found in the Royal Palace, he fell madly in love with one of Ahmed al-Abbas's paternal half-sisters. He protested his love for her and urged for his desire to wed her, which consequently happened in 1660. Ahmed al-Abbas's half-sister always retained a desire to avenge her brother which she did in 1667. She reportedly drugged Abdul Karim Abu Bakr Al-Shabani, slaughtered him and ordered his body to be trained out of the Palace, which was carried out.

Ahmad al-Abbas's eldest daughter or sister was Lalla Mariem, she married Moulay Ahmed ben Mehrez in 1668, after Moulay Al-Rashid's conquest of Marrakesh.

In the Saadian Tombs are the graves of both Sultan Ahmed al-Abbas's daughter Al-Ruqyah and his wife a daughter of Al-Hussein Al-Jerrar.
