= Baldassare Diego Loyola =

Moroccan prince converted to Catholicism

The Reverend Baldassare Diego Loyola S.J.
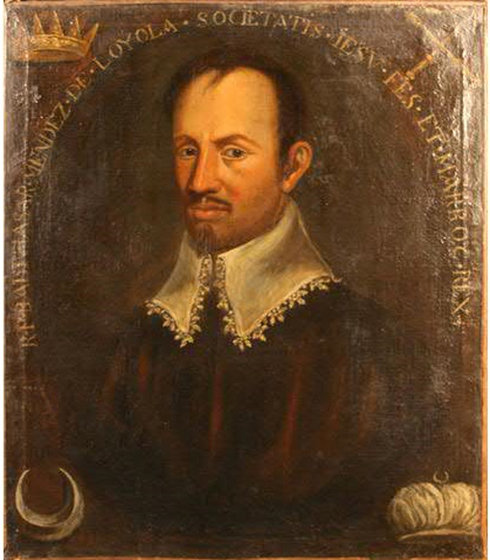
- Portrait at the Jesuit Convent in Toulouse, c. 1670
- Church: Catholic Church

Orders
- Ordination: 27 December 1663

Personal details
- Born: Muhammad el-Attaz; 1631 Fez, Morocco
- Died: 15 September 1667 (aged 35–36) Colegio Imperial, Madrid, Spain
- Denomination: Sunni Islam (until 1656); Roman Catholicism (from 1656)

Baldassare Diego Loyola (Note: His baptismal name in Italian was Baldassare Diego Loyola. Sources use many slightly different variants and spellings of his name, including Baldassare de Loyola Mandes, Baldassarre de Loyola Méndes, Baldassarre Loyola Mandes, Balthasar or Balthazar de Loyola, and Balthazar Mendez de Loyola.) (1631–1667), born Muhammad el-Attaz, (Note: Sources use several slightly different variants of his birth name, including Muhammad el-Attaz and Moulay Mohammed El Attaz. In some contemporary European sources, his birth name was rendered Mehmed or Mehemet Bin Thesi.) was a Moroccan prince of the Saadi dynasty who converted from Islam to Roman Catholicism and became a Jesuit priest. In 1651, he was captured by the Knights Hospitaller and he was enslaved in Malta until 1656. After being ransomed and freed, he converted, became a priest and devoted himself to the evangelisation of Muslims in Italy. He wanted to become a missionary, but he died in Spain before he was able to make the journey to his intended destination of India.

== Early life, capture and enslavement ==
Muhammad el-Attaz was born in 1631 as the son of Abdelwahid of the Saadi dynasty, king or prince of Fez. He was most likely a great-grandson of sultan Ahmad al-Mansur. Born a Muslim, he studied the Quran at a young age, and by the time he was 20 years old he was married and had three children. During the summer of 1651, he left without his father's consent to make the Hajj to Mecca. He boarded an English ship in Tunis, and while they were near Cape Bon en route to Egypt they were intercepted by the galley squadron of the Knights Hospitaller under the command of Captain General Balthasar Demandolx. 32 Moroccan travelers including el-Attaz and his retinue were taken captive by the Hospitallers, and they were taken to Malta as slaves.

El-Attaz was initially imprisoned along with other Muslim slaves inside the bagnio, but he received special treatment in recognition of his social status and he was later transferred to the house of Portuguese balí Diego de Melo in Valletta. Due to his knowledge of Arabic, he was able to communicate with both fellow Muslim slaves and with Maltese people, and he spent most of his time copying the Quran and teaching Islamic law to other slaves. El-Attaz remained a Muslim throughout his enslavement, and in his autobiography he did not mention being under pressure to convert to Christianity. After five years in Malta, his ransom was paid and he was freed from slavery.

== Conversion to Christianity and priesthood ==
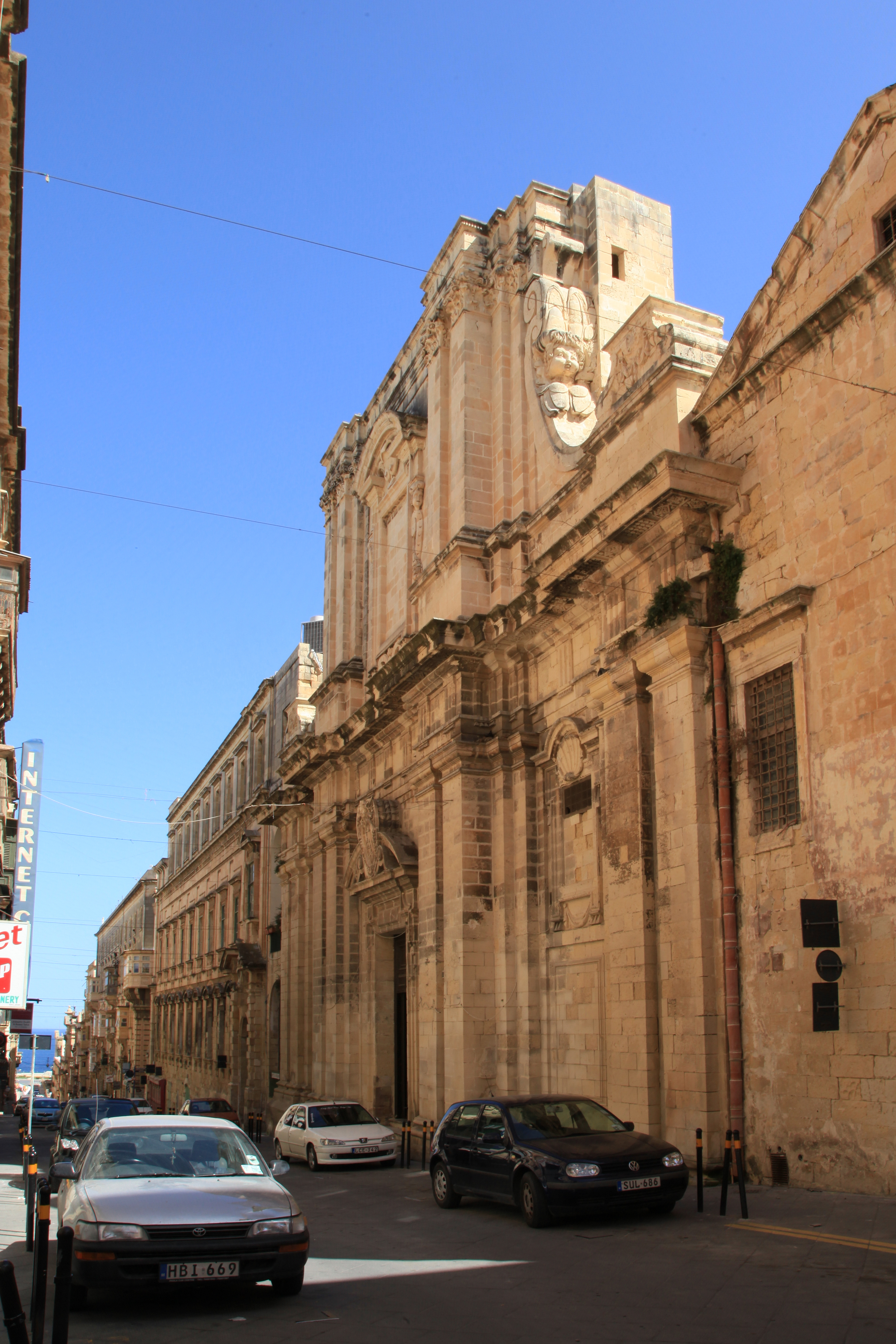
The Church of the Jesuits in Valletta, where Loyola was baptised, as photographed in 2013

On 12 June 1656, as he was preparing to leave Malta, he is said to have experienced a vision which compelled him to abandon Islam and convert to Christianity. According to his autobiography, this occurred while he was at the residence of Balthasar Demandolx, who he had become close to during his stay on the island. Some other authors gave a more embellished version and reinterpreted the vision as being a miracle, claiming that it happened while he was leaving Malta on board a ship which was then driven back to the island by strong winds. The vision is said to have compelled el-Attaz to declare himself a Christian and seek baptism instead of reuniting with his family in Morocco; he also reportedly declared Muhammad to be a false prophet. On 31 July 1656, the centenary of the death of Saint Ignatius of Loyola, he was baptised as a Catholic at the Church of the Jesuits in Valletta. De Melo acted as his godfather, and el-Attaz changed his name to Baldassare Diego Loyola, combining the names of Demandolx, de Melo and the saint.

After his conversion, Loyola traveled to Palermo and Messina on Sicily and decided to join the Jesuits. Although people of Muslim ancestry were normally forbidden from joining the Jesuits in line with a decree from the Society's fifth General Congregation of 1593, his case was discussed during the eleventh General Congregation of 1661 and an exception was made for him. He began his novitiate and was ordained a priest on 27 December 1663.

Between 1664 and 1667, he preached to captives in the port cities of Genoa and Naples and he reportedly managed to convert almost 800 Muslims to Christianity. On one occasion in Naples, he desecrated the Quran by stamping on the book and tearing out its pages in front of a crowd of Muslims. During this time in Italy, he was in touch with various leading religious and political figures, including Cardinals Antonio Barberini and Benedetto Odescalchi and members of the Savoy, Medici and Doria families. While in Turin in August 1664, he met and befriended Domenico Ottomano, an alleged Ottoman prince who had also converted to Christianity after being captured by the Hospitallers.

Loyola is said to have desired to go to a Muslim territory where he could die as a martyr. Superior General Giovanni Paolo Oliva permitted him to become a missionary in the Mughal Empire in North India, and in 1667 he embarked on a journey to Lisbon, from where he intended to board a ship to India. While en route, he reunited with Demandolx in Arles but he fell ill while in Madrid and he was unable to complete his journey. He died at the Colegio Imperial de Madrid on 15 September 1667. The Queen of Spain, Mariana of Austria, visited him before his death and his funeral was held at Colegio Imperial.

== Sources and legacy ==
Loyola's life is recorded in a wide variety of sources, including an unpublished Autobiography, over 200 letters written by Loyola himself and an unpublished biography by his spiritual director Domenico Brunacchi. Loyola came to be a symbol of the Counter-Reformation and several plays, poems and other literary works were written about his life, including the sacred drama El Gran Principe de Fez Don Balthasar de Loyola (1668) by Pedro Calderón de la Barca. Brunacchi's biography and Pedro Calderón de la Barca's drama were probably written in order to support his beatification and eventual canonization, and the drama was performed in Jesuit colleges. In Sermon fúnebre historial (1667) by Pedro Francisco Esquex, parallels were drawn between his life and that of Saint Paul, as both started out as enemies of Christianity before converting and becoming missionaries.

Sami Lakmahri, Moroccan journalist of monthly Zamane, wrote that: "In the 17th century, on both sides, forced conversions are legion. [...] Can we think that Mohammed El Attaz in reality only sought to ease his captive condition or seek liberation? The ecclesiastical career following the conversion of El Attaz allows room for doubt. Balthazar is not just a Christian. His status of out-of-standard man of faith can not be achieved without an extreme religious devotion".

Lakmahri also stated that "in terms of propaganda, Christian notables can not imagine a better story. A Muslim prince, pious and wise, chose to join the cause of Jesus Christ. The history of this incredible conversion abounds in Western literature. Writings of historians, clerics and even plays, all types have taken over the Balthazar story. The goal is to make the Moroccan a significant religious figure of his time. A proof of the basis of the struggle of Christians against infidel "Mohammedans". If even the highest Muslim leaders embrace the Christian faith, his superiority while longer is out of doubt".

== Bibliography ==
- P. Duclos: article Loyola Mandes (Attazi), in Diccionario historico de la Compañia de Jesús, vol.III, Roma, IHSI, 2001, pp. 2428.
- C. García Goldáraz: Un príncipe de Fez jesuita: Sceih Muhammad Attasi, en religión P. Baltasar Diego Loyola de Mandes (1631-1667). Estudio sobre su ascendencia regia, in Miscelánea Comillas, vol.2 (1944), pp. 487–541.
- L. Lebessou: La seconde vie d'un sultan du Maroc, in Étvdes, vol.123 (1910), pp. 488–498.
- E. Colombo, A Muslim Turned Jesuit: Baldassarre Loyola Mandes (1631-1667), in Journal of Early Modern History 17 (2013): 479–504.
- E. Colombo, Baldassarre Loyola de Mandes (1631-1667), Prince de Fez and Jésuite, in Les Musulmans dans l’histoire de l’Europe, tome 1: Une intégration invisible, eds. Bernard Vincent and Jocelyne Dakhlia (Paris: Albin Michel, 2011), 159–193.
- E. Colombo, Infidels at Home. Jesuits and Muslim Slaves in Seventeenth-Century Naples and Spain, in Journal of Jesuit Studies 1 (2014): 192–211.
- E. Colombo, Telling the Untellable. Geography of Conversion of a Muslim Jesuit, in Space and Conversion: A Global Approach eds. Wietse De Boer, Aliocha Maldavsky, and Giuseppe Marcocci (Leiden: Brill, 2014), 285-307 [with R. Sacconaghi].
