= Al Walid ibn Zaydan =

10th Ruler of Saadi Dynasty

Saadi Sultan
- Reign: 1631 – 1636
- Predecessor: Abu Marwan Abd al-Malik II
- Successor: Muhammad al-Shaykh al-Saghir
- Born: Saadi Sultanate
- Died: 21 February 1636; Saadi Sultanate
Names
- Al Walid bin Zidan Abu Maali
- Dynasty: House of Saadi
- Father: Zidan Abu Maali
- Religion: Sunni Islam

Al Walid ibn Zaydan (Arabic: الوليد بن زيدان), also known as Mulay al-Walid (? – 21 February 1636) was the Saadi Sultan from 1631 to 1636.

He was assassinated by French renegades on February 1636. Al Walid ben Zidan was succeeded by his brother Mohammed esh-Sheikh es-Seghir.

His son Mohammed al-Attaz converted to Christianity and became a Jesuit priest, under the name Balthazar of Loyola.

== Notes ==
Preceded by Abu Marwan Abd al-Malik II	Saadi Sultan; 1631–1636	Succeeded by Mohammed esh Sheikh es Seghir
