= John Harrison (diplomat) =

English representative

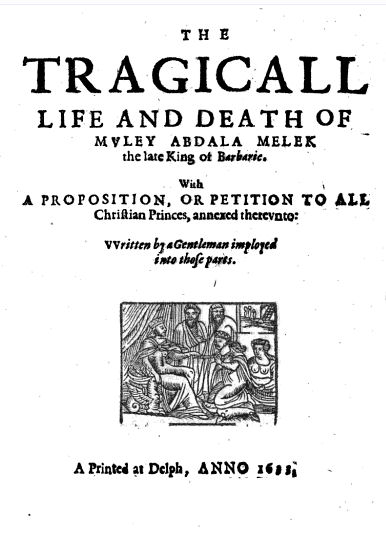
John Harrison's book, published in 1633.

John Harrison was an English representative in Morocco in the 17th century.

James I of England sent John Harrison to Muley Zaydan in Morocco in 1610 and again in 1613 and 1615 in order to obtain the release of English captives. He negotiated a treaty in May 1627 with Sidi al-Ayachi, independent governor of Salé, who had risen a month before against Mulay Zaydan.

Harrison published an account of the Sultan Mulay Abd al-Malik in 1633.

== Works ==
- Late Newes out of Barbary (London: Arthur Jonson, 1613)
- The New Prophetical King of Barbary (London: Arthur Jonson, 1613)
- The Messiah Alreadie Come, Or Proofs of Christianitie (Amsterdam: Giles Thorp, 1613)
- A Short Relation of the Departure of the High and Mighty Prince Frederick King Elect of Bohemia (Dort: George Waters, 1619)
- The Reasons which compelled the States of Bohemia to reject the Archduke Ferdinand (Dort: George Waters, 1619)
- The Messiah Already Come, Or Proofs of Christianitie (Amsterdam: Giles Thorp, 1619)
- Bohemica Jura Defensa: The Bohemian Laws or Rights Defended, Against the Informer (1620)
- The Tragical Life and Death of Muley Abdala Melek the late King of Barbarie (Delft, 1633)
- A Vindication of the Holy Scriptures, Or the Manifestation of Jesus Christ the True Messiah Already Come (London: J.M., 1656)
- Proofs of Christianity: historically setting forth Jesus Christ the true Messiah already come (London: J. Playford, 1658)

== See also ==
- Anglo-Moroccan alliance
