= Muhammad al-Shaykh al-Saghir =

11th Ruler of Saadi Dynasty

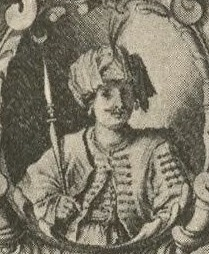
- Mohammed esh Sheikh es Seghir, by Adriaen Matham, 1640

Saadi Sultan
- Reign: 1636 – 1655
- Predecessor: Al Walid ben Zidan
- Successor: Ahmad al-Abbas
- Born: Unknown ?
- Died: 30 January 1655
- Burial: 1655; Saadian Tombs
- Issue: Ahmad al-Abbas
Names
- Mohammed esh-Sheikh es-Seghir bin Zidan Abu Maali
- Dynasty: Saadi
- Father: Zidan al-Nasir
- Religion: Sunni Islam

Muhammad al-Shaykh al-Saghir (Arabic: محمد الشيخ الأصغر السعدي) (? – 30 January 1655) was the Saadi Sultan from 1636 to 1655.

== Life ==
His father was Zidan al-Nasir (r. 1603–1627), he was the son of a Spanish mother and he had two Spanish wives. He spoke good Spanish, which may have led to him to continue the long-time services of royal advisor Moses Pallache, nephew of Samuel Pallache of the Pallache family.

His portrait can be found in an engraving of Marrakesh by Adriaen Matham in 1640, made on the occasion of a visit by the ambassador of the Netherlands to the sultan.

Mohammed esh-Sheikh es-Seghir tried to concentrate the entire Moroccan foreign trade in Safi at the hands of the English, and to obtain warships from their king to prevent all trade with the south, but the sultan was afraid of breaking relations with the Dutch and the French. In 1638, the Sultan sent his ambassador Muhammad bin Askar to England, who was carrying a letter to hasten King Charles I of England to send the required weapons and ammunition to Morocco and to suppress the English merchants who were selling weapons to the rebels. This was based on the treaty concluded between the two countries on September 20, 1637, which stipulated that no relationship should be established between the Kingdom of England and the sultan's enemies in Santa Cruz. Despite this, English merchants continued to smuggle weapons into the desert.

== See also ==
- Al Walid ben Zidan
- Saadian Tombs

Preceded by Al Walid ben Zidan	Saadi sultan 1636–1655	Succeeded by Ahmad al-Abbas
