= Zidan Abu Maali =

Saadi sultan of Morocco from 1603 to 1627

Sultan of Morocco
- Reign: 1603–1627
- Predecessor: Ahmad al-Mansur
- Successor: Abu Marwan Abd al-Malik II
- Born: Saadi Sultanate
- Died: September 1627; Saadi Sultanate
- Issue: Ahmed Elasgher; Abu Marwan Abd al-Malik II; Al Walid ben Zidan; Mohammed esh-Sheikh es-Seghir
Names
- Zidan Abu Maali bin Ahmad al-Mansur
Era dates
- 16th–17th centuries
- Dynasty: House of Saadi
- Father: Ahmad al-Mansur
- Mother: Aisha bint Abu Bakkar al-Shabani
- Religion: Sunni Islam

Zidan Abu Maali (or Muley Zidan; Arabic: زيدان أبو المعالي, romanized: Zaydān Abū 'l-Maʿālī; died September 1627) was the embattled Saadi sultan of Morocco from 1603 to 1627. He was the son and heir of Ahmad al-Mansur by his wife Lalla Aisha bint Abu Bakkar, a lady of the Chebanate tribe.

He ruled only over the southern half of the country after his brother, Mohammed esh Sheikh el Mamun, took the northern half and a rebel from Tafilalt, Ahmed ibn Abi Mahalli, marched on Marrakesh claiming to be the Mahdi. This led Muley Zidan to be encircled in Safi amid other failed military campaigns against the rebellious north. These events were exacerbated by a context of chaos that ensued amid a pandemic of bubonic plague, which left a third of the country dead. Spanish privateers seized Zidan's manuscripts while they were in transit off the coast of Morocco. They brought them to El Escorial, where the Zaydani Library still maintains them.

His reign saw the end of the Anglo-Spanish war with the Treaty of London 1604, which broke the Anglo-Dutch axis that Morocco was relying upon as a means of protection from Spain. This permitted the Spanish navy to resume devastating raids on the Moroccan coast and to incite a rebellion by one of his provincial governors, who established the independent Republic of Salé between Azemmour and Salé.

== Civil war ==
During the reign of Zidan, after the death of Sultan Ahmad al-Mansur in 1603, Morocco fell into a state of anarchy with the latter's sons fighting for the throne. Zidan lost much of his authority to warring factions and insubordinate local governors. Morocco was in a state of civil war with the uprising of warlords such as Ahmed ibn Abi Mahalli in the South and Sidi al-Ayachi in the North taking territories from Zidan. Sidi especially was held in high regard among local warriors, he controlled many thousands of men to fight for him. Moreover, he openly showed his dissatisfaction with Zidan, whom he pretended to serve.

These uprisings were triggered by Mohammed esh Sheikh el Mamun conceding Larache to the Spanish Empire in 1610, but they also seized the opportunity to capture al-Ma'mura (now Mehdya, Morocco). These events considerably diminished the religious prestige of the Saadians as Defenders of the Faith. The hardest blow during Zidan's reign was undoubtedly Ahmed ibn Abi Mahalli's revolt, who, after conquering Tafilalt and Draa in succession, reached the capital Marrakesh in 1612 and occupied it, while Zidan was forced to flee.

== Foreign relations ==
=== Ottoman Empire ===
The civil wars had interrupted the tribute of vassalage that was previously paid to the Ottomans by Ahmad al-Mansur until his death, during the reign of Zidan he proposed to submit to paying the tribute in order to protect himself from Algiers, he then resumed paying the tribute to the Ottomans.

=== Dutch Republic ===
Zidan established friendly relations with the Dutch Republic through the efforts of envoys such as Samuel Pallache. From 1609, he established a Treaty of Friendship and Free Commerce, which gave "free access and friendly reception for their respective subjects with any need for safeguard or safe-conduct, no matter how they come to the others' territory." He sent several more envoys to the Low Countries, such as Abul Qasim ibn Mohammed al-Ghassani, Ahmad ibn Qasim al-Hajari, and Yusuf Biscaino.

=== Songhai Empire ===
Zidan and his forces invaded the Songhai Empire in 1593. He abandoned the empire in 1618, but the Moroccan occupation damaged the Songhai state.

=== England ===
James I of England sent John Harrison to Muley Zidan in Morocco in 1610 and again in 1613 and 1615 in order to obtain the release of English captives.

=== Zaydani Library ===
By historical coincidence, a part of the library of this sultan, known as the Zidani Library, has been kept in Spain to the present day. During the revolt of Ahmed ibn Abi Mahalli in 1612, Muley Zidan commissioned a French privateer, Jehan Philippe de Castelane, to move his household goods from Safi to Santa Cruz do Cabo, Agadir, for a sum of 3,000 escudos after suffering a defeat at Marrakesh. After having waited for six days without being paid, Castelane sailed north for Marseille, with the cargo still aboard, hoping to sell the goods to recoup his losses. Some 4 ships from the fleet of Spanish Admiral Luis Fajardo intercepted the vessel near Mehdya and took it to Lisbon (then part of Spain) and convicted the crew of piracy. From Lisbon, Zidan's library was then taken to Cádiz and inventoried. After Cádiz, the collection would continue on its journey, by order of Philip III to be taken to the home of council member Juan de Idiáquez in Madrid. Two years later in 1614 the collection was transmitted to El Escorial for permanent storage. This collection contained around 4,000 books and manuscripts. The collection remains in the Escorial to this day, and is one of the most significant collections of Arabic manuscripts in Europe.

Interestingly, at the time of this seizure of Zidan's manuscripts, written Arabic was largely prohibited in Spain, with the Spanish Inquisition behind the destruction of many Arabic works. During this period, officials would search the homes of Spanish Muslims to confiscate and destroy Arabic-language manuscripts. However, the wealthy and influential were somewhat exempt from these prohibitions, and were able to save some Arabic manuscripts by sending them to the Escorial for study. Such was the case for Zidan's collection. Idiaquez's nephew, Francisco Gurmendi along with Juan de Peralta requested that the collection be brought to the Escorial for this purpose. Peralta was also interested in the Escorial's acquisition of the collection since the addition would bolster the library's prominence. Others, such as Thomas Erpinius, also advocated for the study of the Arabic language to use as a tool in forcing Muslims to convert to Christianity. Even so, the saved manuscripts, including Zidan's library, were not made available to the public, and kept separate from the rest of the Escorial's collection.

== See also ==
- El Escorial, where manuscripts of the Zidani Library is kept

Preceded by Ahmad al-Mansur	Sultan of Morocco; 1603–1627	Succeeded by Abu Marwan Abd al-Malik II
