= Saadi Sultanate =

1510–1659 state in Morocco and Northwest Africa

Saadi Sultanate السعديون (Arabic)
- 1510–1659
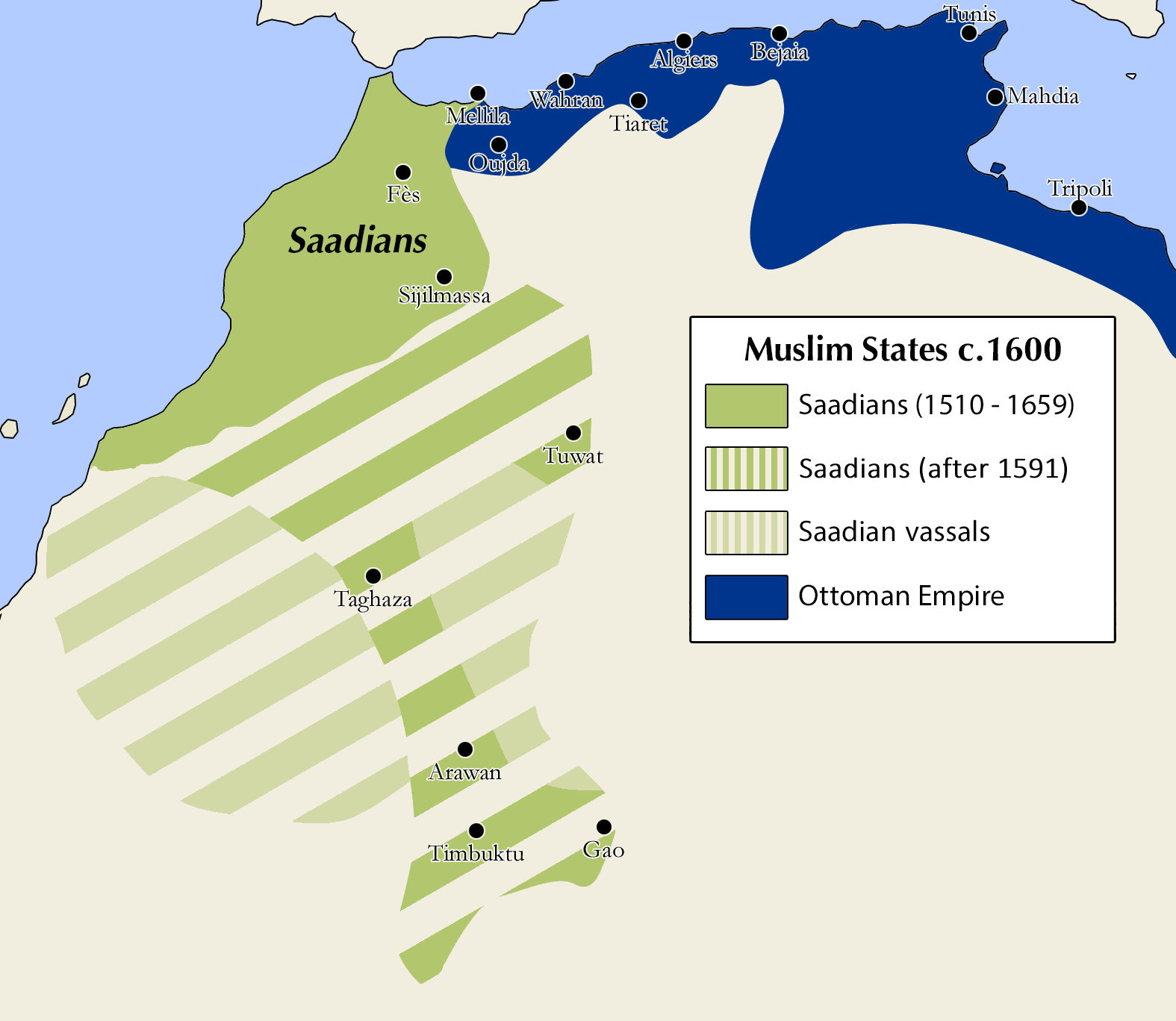
- Extent of the Saadian empire at the beginning of the 17th century
- Status: Ruling dynasty of Morocco
- Capital: Tidsi (1510–1513); Afughal (1513–1525); Marrakesh (1525–1659); Fez (1603–1627, rival capital)
- Common languages: Arabic, Berber languages
- Religion: Sunni Islam
- Government: Monarchy (Sultanate)
- Sultan
  - 1510–1517: Muhammad al-Qa'im
  - 1655–1659: Ahmad al-Abbas
- History
  - Established: 1510
  - Capture of Agadir: 1541
  - Battle of Fez: 1554
  - Battle of the Three Kings: 1578
  - Defeat of Songhai Empire: 1591
  - Disestablished: 1659
- Currency: Dinar
Preceded by
Wattasid Sultanate
Songhai Empire
Succeeded by
Alawi Sultanate
Bou Regreg Republic
Pashalik of Timbuktu
Dila'iya Sultanate

The Saadi Sultanate (Note: Also rendered in English as Sa'di, Sa'did, Sa'dian, or Saadian.) (Arabic: السعديون, romanized: as-saʿdiyyūn), also known as the Sharifian Sultanate (Arabic: السلطنة الشريفة), was a state which ruled present-day Morocco and parts of Northwest Africa in the 16th and 17th centuries. It was led by the Saadi dynasty, an Arab Sharifian dynasty.

The dynasty's rise to power started in 1510, when Muhammad al-Qa'im was declared leader of the tribes of the Sous valley in southern Morocco in their resistance against the Portuguese who occupied Agadir and other coastal cities. Al-Qai'm's son, Ahmad al-Araj, secured control of Marrakesh by 1525 and, after a period of rivalry, his brother Muhammad al-Shaykh captured Agadir from the Portuguese and eventually captured Fez from the Wattasids, securing control over nearly all of Morocco. After Muhammad al-Shaykh's assassination by the Ottomans in 1557 his son Abdallah al-Ghalib enjoyed a relatively peaceful reign. His successors, however, fought with each other, culminating in the 1578 Battle of Ksar el-Kebir (or "Battle of the Three Kings"), where a Portuguese military intervention on behalf of Muhammad II al-Mutawakkil was thoroughly defeated by Saadian forces. In the wake of this victory, Ahmad al-Mansur became sultan and presided over the apogee of Saadian power. In the later half of his reign he launched a successful invasion of the Songhai Empire, resulting in the establishment of a Pashalik centered on Timbuktu. After Al-Mansur's death in 1603, however, his sons fought a long internecine conflict for succession which divided the country and undermined the dynasty's power and prestige. While the Saadian realm was reunified at the end of the conflict in 1627, new factions in the region rose to challenge Saadian authority. The last Saadian sultan, Ahmad al-Abbas, was assassinated in 1659, bringing the dynasty to an end. Moulay al-Rashid later conquered Marrakesh in 1668 and led the 'Alawi dynasty to establish a new sultanate over Morocco.

The Saadians were an important chapter in the history of Morocco. They were the first Arab Sharifian dynasty to rule Morocco since the Idrisids, establishing a model of political-religious legitimacy which continued under the later 'Alawis, another Sharifian dynasty. They successfully resisted Ottoman expansion, making Morocco the only part of North Africa to remain outside Ottoman suzerainty, but followed Ottoman example by modernizing their army and adopting gunpowder weapons. During the long reign of Ahmad al-Mansur in the late 16th century, Morocco established itself as an ambitious regional power that expanded into West Africa and pursued relations with Europe, including a potential alliance with England against Spain. The Saadians were also significant patrons of art and architecture, with Abdallah al-Ghalib and Ahmad al-Mansur both responsible for some of the most celebrated monuments of Moroccan architecture.

== Origins of the dynasty ==
The Saadi dynasty claimed descent from the Islamic prophet Muhammad through the line of Ali ibn Abi Talib and Fatima Zahra (Muhammad's daughter), and more specifically through Muhammad al-Nafs al-Zakiyya, grandson of Hasan ibn Ali. Since the early 14th century they had been established at Tagmadert in the valley of the Draa River. In the mid-15th century some of them established themselves at Tidsi in the Sous valley, near Taroudant. They claimed Sharifian origins through an ancestor from Yanbu and rendered Sufism respectable in Morocco. The name Saadi or Saadian derives from "sa'ada" meaning happiness or salvation. Others think it derives from the name Bani Zaydan or that it was given to the Bani Zaydan (shurafa of Tagmadert) by later generations and rivals for power, who tried to deny their Hassanid descent by claiming that they came from the family of Halimah Saadiyya, Muhammad's wet nurse. They are also known as the Zaydanids, based on their putative ancestor Zaydan Ibn Ahmed, a Sharif from Yanbu.

== History ==
=== Rise to power ===
==== The rise of Al-Qa'im in the south ====
The Saadians were a Sharifian family which had first established themselves in the Draa valley in the 14th century before moving or spreading to Tidsi in the Sous valley in the following century. Here they lived alongside Sufi teachers and marabouts who promoted the doctrines of al-Jazuli. The beginning of the Saadian rise to power took place in the context of weak central rule in Morocco and of Portuguese expansionism along its Atlantic coast. The Wattasid dynasty, which ruled from Fez in the north, had little authority over the south of the country. Under their reign, Portuguese expansion along the Moroccan coast reached its apogee. Many local resistance and jihad movements, often associated with various Sufi brotherhoods or establishments, arose to oppose the European presence.

In 1505 the Portuguese occupied Agadir (on the coast, near the mouth of the Sous river), which they called Santa Cruz do Cabo de Aguer, and from their territory here other European merchants also operated, notably the Genoese. This arrival of European traders and colonisers alarmed the local population and caused the inhabitants of the Sous region to organize themselves politically. According to one recorded tradition, this impetus was made clear when the Portuguese took some tribal warriors captive and demanded that the local tribes choose a leader or representative with whom they could negotiate their release. Either way, in 1510 the Saadian chief Muhammad al-Qa'im (full name: Abū ʿAbd Allāh Muḥammad ibnʿAbd al-Raḥman al-Qāʾim Biamr Allāh) was formally recognized in Tidsi by the tribes of the Sous and the Sufi groups as their military leader and political representative. The army that developed around the Saadian movement drew its original tribal nucleus from the Jazula and the Arab Banu Ma'qil, making both groupings central to the military foundation upon which the emerging dynasty built its power. Tidsi remained Al-Qa'im's base for three years until he moved to Afughal in the Haha region in 1513, the burial site of Al-Jazuli. This was done at the invitation of the Shayazima tribe, which had been involved decades earlier in a rebellion against the Wattasids. This associated the early Saadians with both the followers of al-Jazuli and with an implicit opposition to the Wattasids.

In 1513 Al-Qa'im also appointed his elder son Ahmad al-'Araj as his successor and left him as governor in the Sous while he moved to Afughal. The Sous valley was a crucial stage in the trans-Saharan trade routes and, despite the jihad against Portuguese encroachment, European trade also increased in the region, all of which brought great profit to Al-Araj and to the Saadian movement. Portuguese expansion also threatened the commercial and pastoral interests of Ma'qil tribes connected with the routes between the Sahara, the Sous and the Atlantic coast. The Rahamna, a Ma'qil tribe then established in the Moroccan Sahara, fought the Portuguese and subsequently moved north during the establishment of Saadian power. Their participation illustrates how the Saadians' original base in the Sous was reinforced by Ma'qil forces from the wider southern and Saharan regions.

In 1515 the Saadians helped repel a Portuguese attack on Marrakesh but they were not yet in a position to claim the city for themselves.

==== The sons of Al-Qa'im ====
Upon Al-Qa'im's death in 1517 he was buried next to Al-Jazuli in Afughal. Al-Araj inherited his father's main position at Afughal, north of the Atlas Mountains, while his younger brother Muhammad al-Shaykh was in turn charged with the Sous, south of the mountains. These two amirs became the true founders of the Saadian dynasty and its growing power. Among other things, Muhammad al-Shaykh also encouraged the production and export of sugar from the Sous, which thereafter became the region's main export. While famine or plague in 1520-1521 interrupted military efforts, Saadian power continue to grow across much of southern Morocco and began expelling the Europeans (Portuguese and Spanish) from their posts in the region. In 1523 open hostilities were declared between the Saadians and the Wattasid ruler in Fes, Muhammad al-Burtuqali. Al-Araj was admitted peacefully into Marrakesh in 1521 upon marrying the daughter of the Hintata leader Muhammad ibn Nasir Bu Shantuf who was occupying the city, but in 1524 or 1525 he had Bu Shantuf assassinated and, with the help of his brother Muhammad and reinforcements, captured the Kasbah, thus finally taking control of the city. At this time, or slightly before, Al-Araj arranged for the remains of his father Al-Qa'im and of Al-Jazuli to be transferred to Marrakesh, founding a new funerary complex (the Zawiya of Sidi Ben Slimane al-Jazuli) and symbolically cementing the city as a spiritual and political capital of the Saadians.

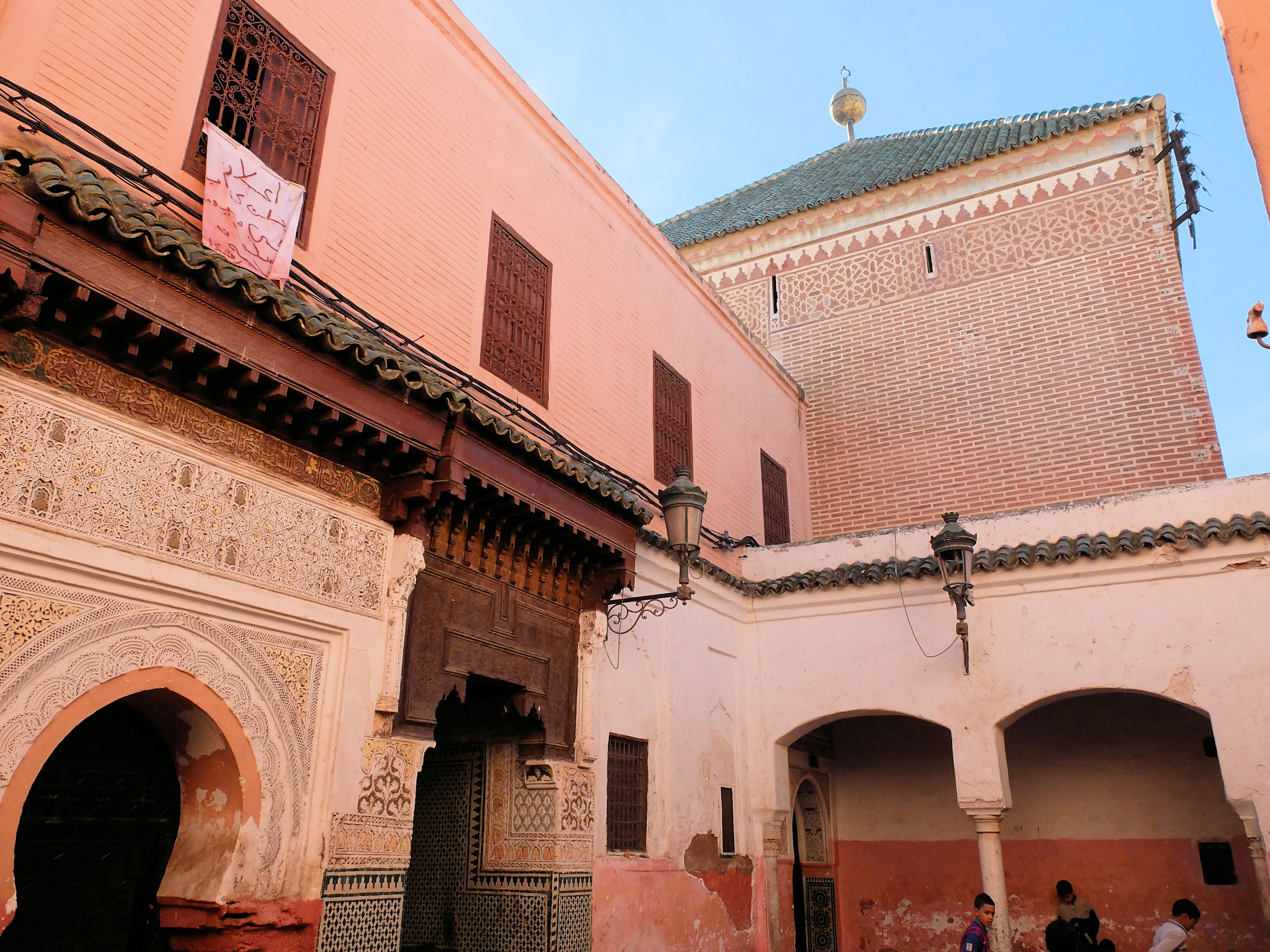
The Zawiya and mausoleum of Al-Jazuli today, founded in Marrakesh after Ahmad al-Araj moved Al-Jazuli's body here around 1524

The Wattasids, unable to prevent the capture of Marrakesh, attempted to retake the city and expel the Saadians several times. Muhammad al-Burtuqali's successor, Ahmad al-Wattasi, attacked it twice, unsuccessfully: he besieged the city in 1527 but was forced to withdraw early, and he failed again in an indecisive battle in 1529 at Animay, near Demnate. The two sides agreed to the 1527 Treaty of Tadla, whereby Morocco was partitioned roughly along the Oum Er-Rbia River (in the Tadla region) between the Wattasids in the north and the Saadians in the south. (Note: Some sources place this formal partition agreement to later dates, after the other Wattasid defeats. Encyclopedia of Islam (as cited in-text: Véronne (2012), "Saʿdids") dates it to 1530, while Jamil Abun-Nasr ("A history of the Maghrib in the Islamic period", 1987, p. 211) dates it to 1536, after the decisive battle of Wadi al-'Abid.) Conflict broke out again in 1530 but resulted in similar truce. In 1536 the Saadians decisively routed the Wattasid army at Wadi al-'Abid (or Oued el-'Abid), forcing the Wattasids to recognize their rule over the south along the established frontier. In 1537 they also took control over the Tafilalt region.

The treaty between Al-Araj and the Wattasids, along with Al-Araj's growing power, provoked the jealousy of his brother Muhammad and of the Sous tribes, who worried that their influence in the Saadian movement was waning. After the war with the Wattasids, however, the Saadians focused on the Portuguese. In 1541 Muhammad al-Shaykh captured Agadir from the Portuguese. This caused the latter to also evacuate Azemmour and Safi that same year and announced the collapse of Portuguese colonial power in Morocco. This greatly enhanced Muhammad al-Shaykh's reputation across the country and further undermined the Wattasids who had sought coexistence with the Portuguese. At around this time the relations between Muhammad and his brother Ahmad al-Araj deteriorated into open conflict. By one account, Muhammad refused to share the booty from Agadir's capture with Ahmad. Muhammad had his brother imprisoned, then reached an agreement with him in 1542, before another open conflict between them in 1543 resulted in Muhammad's victory and Ahmad's exile to the Tafilalt. (Historian Jamil Abun-Nasr places the conflict between the brothers at a different time, in 1539–1540, shortly before Muhammad's victory at Agadir.)

==== Conquest of Fes and confrontation with the Ottomans ====
Now the sole ruler of the Saadian realm, Muhammad al-Shaykh turned his attention to the Wattasids. In 1545 he defeated and captured Ahmad al-Wattasi near Wadi Derna. Ahmad al-Wattasi was released two years later, in 1547, and ceded Meknes to the Saadians. Al-Shaykh nonetheless laid siege to Fes, the Wattasid capital, that same year. The siege lasted until January 28, 1549, when the Saadians finally took the city, leaving Al-Shaykh as sole ruler of Morocco. Further north, the Portuguese evacuated Ksar al-Seghir and Asilah in 1550. This set up a confrontation between the Saadians and the Ottomans, whose empire now extended to Algeria. The latter had already provided some aid to the Wattasids in an attempt to stem the growing power of the Saadians. Both sides saw Tlemcen as their next objective. The Saadian army, led by Muhammad al-Harran, son of Muhammad al-Shaykh, conquered the city in June 1550, but the army was partly diverted to the Tafilalt soon after in order to suppress a rebellion there by the exiled Ahmad al-Araj. Al-Shaykh was in turn preoccupied by other rebellions and was unable to send more reinforcements to his son. Al-Harran died of sickness in Tlemcen shortly before an army of Ottoman Janissaries and tribal allies sent by the Ottoman Pasha of Algiers, Hasan Pasha, expelled the Saadian forces from the city and from western Algeria in February 1551.

The Ottoman sultan, Suleiman the Magnificent, sent a diplomatic embassy to Muhammad al-Shaykh in 1552 in an attempt to persuade the latter to accept Ottoman suzerainty, even if just nominally, but this was refused. The Ottomans sent an army, including Janissaries again, led by Salah Ra'is to attack Fes, where they defeated the Saadians in January 1554. They installed 'Ali Abu Hassun, an uncle of Ahmad al-Wattasi who had taken refuge in Spain, as ruler and Ottoman vassal in what was the final attempt by the Wattasids to regain power. Meanwhile, Ahmad al-Araj and his son Zaydan had made themselves lords of the Tafilalt, and allied themselves with Abu Hassun. However, Muhammad al-Shaykh intercepted Abu Hassun's message to his potential allies in the Tafilalt that would have informed them of his victory in Fes. As a result, Al-Araj and his son, believing that their side had lost, surrendered to Al-Shaykh. The latter went on to defeat Abu Hassun at the Battle of Tadla and to retake Fes in September 1554. Abu Hassun died in the battle, putting a definitive end to Wattasid prospects in Morocco. Immediately after this, Muhammad al-Shaykh entered into negotiations with Count Alcaudete, the governor and general of the Spanish forces occupying Oran and other positions on the Algerian coast, to secure an anti-Ottoman alliance with Spain. Alcaudete concluded an agreement in 1555 to offer Al-Shaykh Spanish troops, but the Spanish government initially refused to endorse the plan. Meanwhile, Al-Shaykh had his older brother, Ahmad al-Araj, executed along with many of his sons and grandsons, thus securing the succession of his own son Abdallah. Saadian forces also managed to occupy Tlemcen again in 1556 while the Ottomans were preoccupied with besieging the Spanish in Oran. In the summer of 1557 the Ottoman sultan sent another ambassador to Al-Shaykh demanding more forcefully that he accept Ottoman overlordship, which Al-Shaykh rejected with defiance and contempt. On October 23 of the same year, Muhammad al-Shaykh was assassinated – reportedly on the orders of the Ottoman sultan – by a Turkish member of his bodyguard, Salah ibn Kyahya, who had posed as an Ottoman deserter.

=== Apogee ===
==== Abdallah al-Ghalib and his successors ====
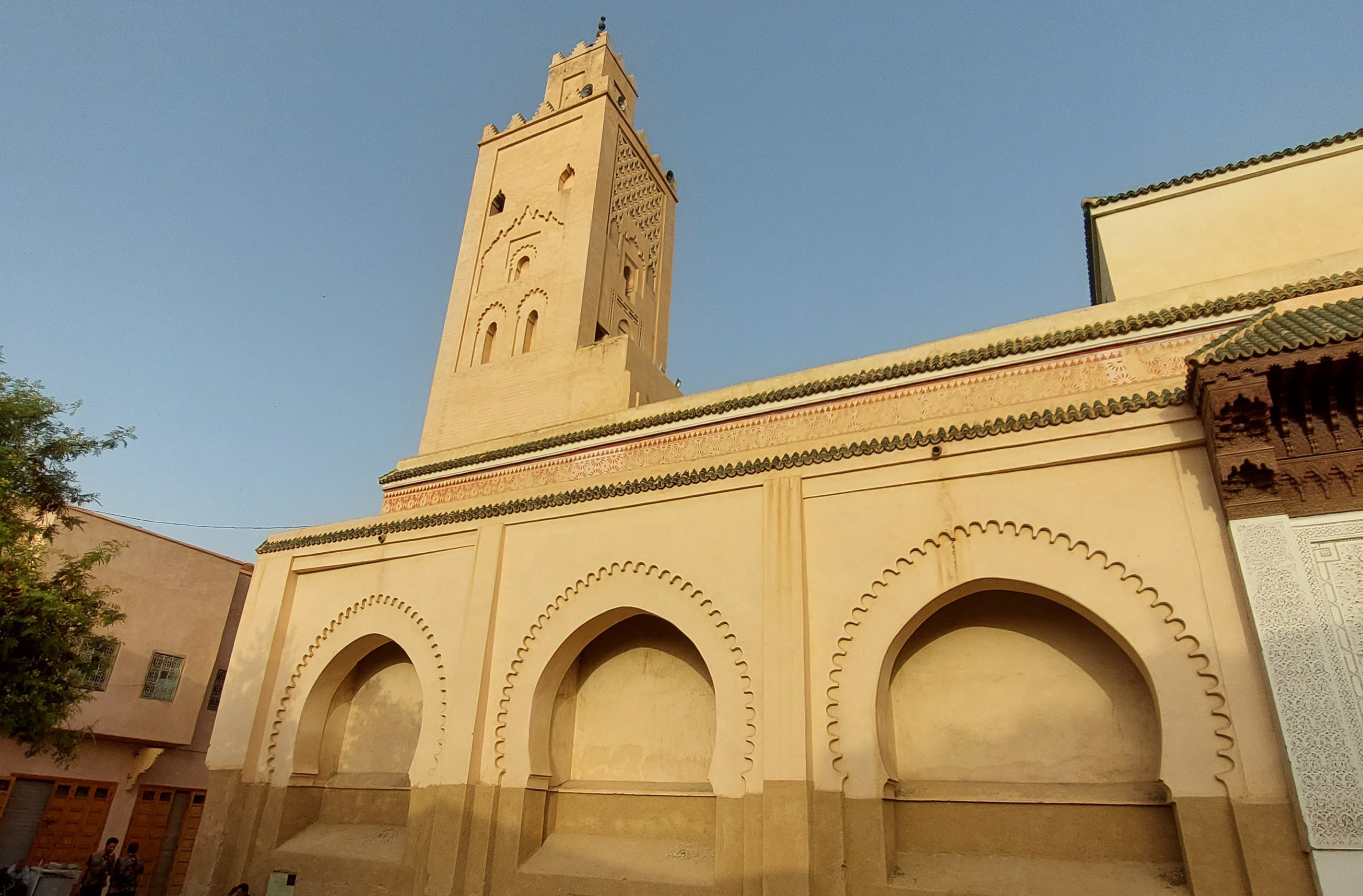
The Bab Doukkala Mosque, built between 1557 and 1571 with the sponsorship of Lalla Mas'uda, during the reign of Moulay Abdallah al-Ghalib

Following the assassination, Abdallah al-Ghalib succeeded his father as sultan. At the same time, three of his brothers – Abd al-Malik, Ahmad, and Abd al-Mu'min – fled the country in fear of assassination and took refuge with the Ottomans. (Though it is possible that Ahmad only fled much later, depending on which historical sources are consulted.) Abdallah was able to have Abd al-Mu'min assassinated years later, circa 1572, but Abd al-Malik entered into the service of the Ottoman sultan.

Hasan Pasha, re-appointed as Ottoman pasha of Algiers, also sent an army to expel the Saadians from Tlemcen once again. The Saadians evacuated the city and were pursued by the Ottomans into Morocco, resulting in the Battle of Wadi al-Laban to the north of Fez in early 1558. The battle has been called indecisive by historian Abun-Nasr since Hasan withdrew from Morocco in part because he had to deal with the Spanish in Algeria, while other authors characterize it as a Saadian victory which effectively ended Ottoman attempts to enter Morocco by military means. Count Alcaudete, in turn, seeing that his alliance with Muhammad al-Shaykh was now moot, attempted to attack Mustaghanim in Algeria, where he died in a disastrous defeat for the Spanish. Abdallah's reign was not marked by significant conquests. In 1560 or 1561 he launched another expedition to re-occupy Tlemcen which failed, marking the end of Saadian attempts to expand eastward. To counter Ottoman and Spanish influence, Al-Ghalib sought to develop relations with France and Northern European powers. He also supported the Morisco uprisings in Spain between 1568 and 1570. In the end, Ottoman pressure on Morocco was reduced by their own defeat at the Battle of Lepanto in 1571. While Al-Ghalib was more passive in foreign policy and military ventures, he was a major builder at home in Marrakesh. Among other things, he built the Mouassine Mosque and the Ben Youssef Madrasa, redeveloped the royal palaces in the Kasbah, repaired the Kasbah Mosque, and started the Saadian Tombs. Fes became the second capital of the kingdom and the main military garrison in the north, where the heir apparent typically served as governor.

Upon Abdallah al-Ghalib's death in 1574 his son Muhammad II al-Mutawakkil inherited the throne. Meanwhile, his uncle, Abd al-Malik, had worked to further secure Ottoman support. He served in the Ottoman army and won some favour by participating in the successful Ottoman Siege of Tunis in 1574, which expelled the Spanish forces there. That same year he travelled to Istanbul and obtained support for his bid to the Saadian throne from the Ottoman sultan Murad III himself. Soon afterwards the sultan ordered the beylerbey (governor) of Algiers, Ramazan Pasha, to assist Abd al-Malik in invading Morocco. In early 1576 the Ottoman army, including a contingent of Janissaries and a supplement of troops led by Abd al-Malik himself, won a decisive victory at the Battle of ar-Rukn near Fez, allowing Abd al-Malik to depose Al-Mutawakkil, who fled. Once on the throne, as an Ottoman vassal, Abd al-Malik had the Friday prayers and the khutba in mosques delivered in the Ottoman sultan's name, adopted Ottoman clothing, and organized his army along Ottoman lines with the help of Turkish officers. This made him the first Saadian ruler to accept vassal status with a foreign power. Nonetheless, Abd al-Malik remained wary of Ottoman motives towards his kingdom and maintained relations with Spain as well as continuing to pursue relations with France (King Henri III) and England (Queen Elizabeth). He also sent the majority of Ottoman troops who had helped him – including the Janissaries – back to Algiers shortly after winning his throne.

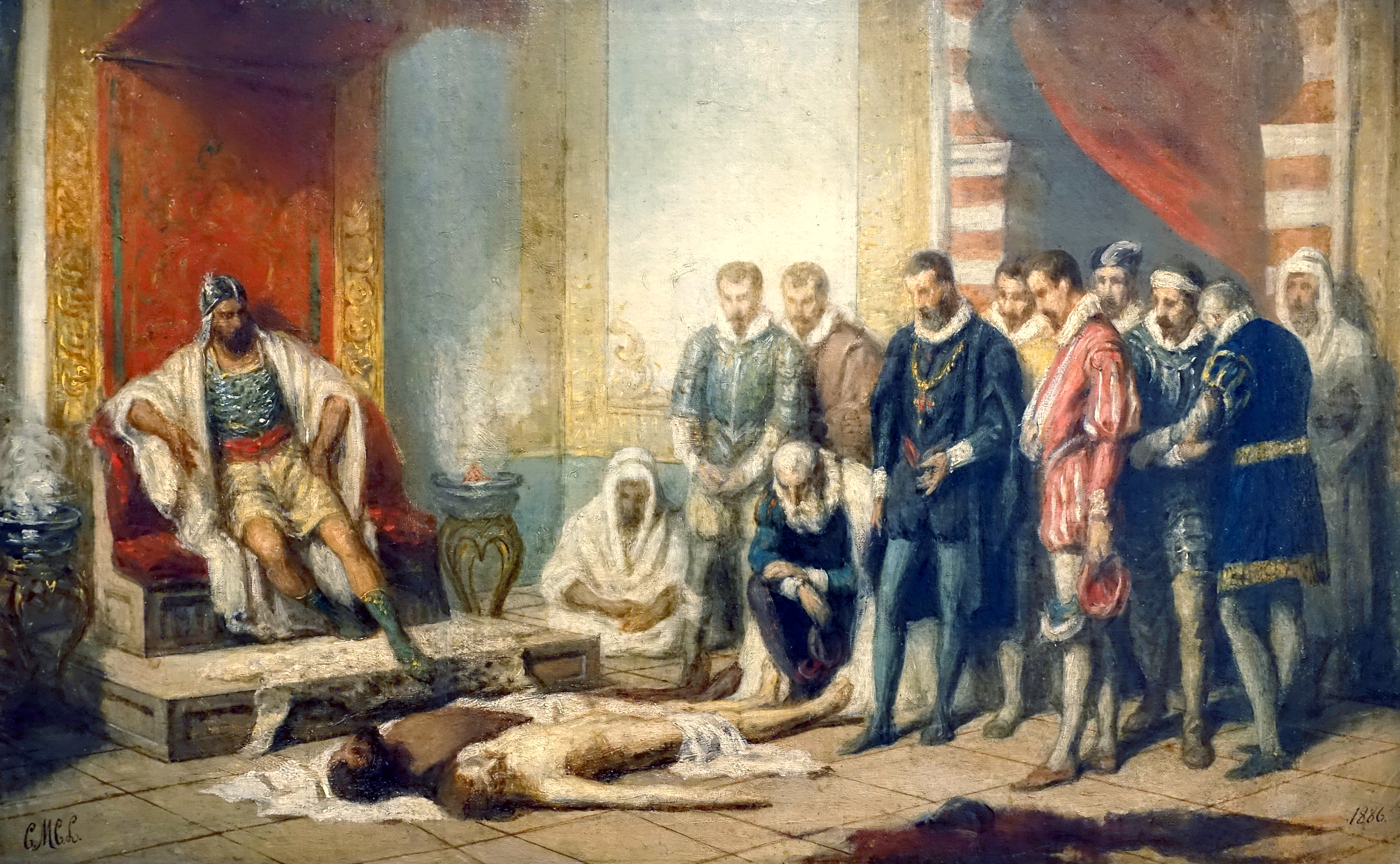
Portuguese depiction of the corpse of King Sebastian I before Ahmad al-Mansur, Caetano Moreira de Costa Lima, 1886

Meanwhile, his deposed nephew, Al-Mutawakkil, sought help from Portugal, whose king, Sebastian I, felt he had the most to lose from the increased Ottoman influence in the region. Sebastian endorsed Al-Mutawakkil's claim and in July 1578 he crossed over into northern Morocco with an army, accompanied by the deposed sultan. While Moroccan sources exaggerate the size of his army, there was no doubt that it was impressive, with the Portuguese king promoting his campaign to the rest of Europe as a crusade and hiring a large force of mercenaries. Sebastian, however, did not use the fortified Portuguese positions along the coast to his advantage and instead decided to march directly into the country's interior. The Saadian army, led by Abd al-Malik, accompanied by his brother Ahmad (yet another son of Muhammad al-Shaykh), met the Portuguese at Wadi al-Makhazin near Ksar al-Kebir on August 4. In the ensuing battle, known as the Battle of Wadi al-Makhazin or the Battle of Alcácer Quibir, the Saadians inflicted a heavy defeat on the Portuguese. Both King Sebastian and Al-Mutawakkil were killed in the battle, while on the Moroccan side Abd al-Malik also died during the battle in uncertain circumstances – either in combat or, by some accounts, poisoned by one of his Turkish officers in order to secure total Ottoman control of Morocco in the aftermath. As a result of the presence and death of these three, the 1578 battle is also known as the "Battle of the Three Kings".

==== The reign of Ahmad al-Mansur (1578–1603) ====
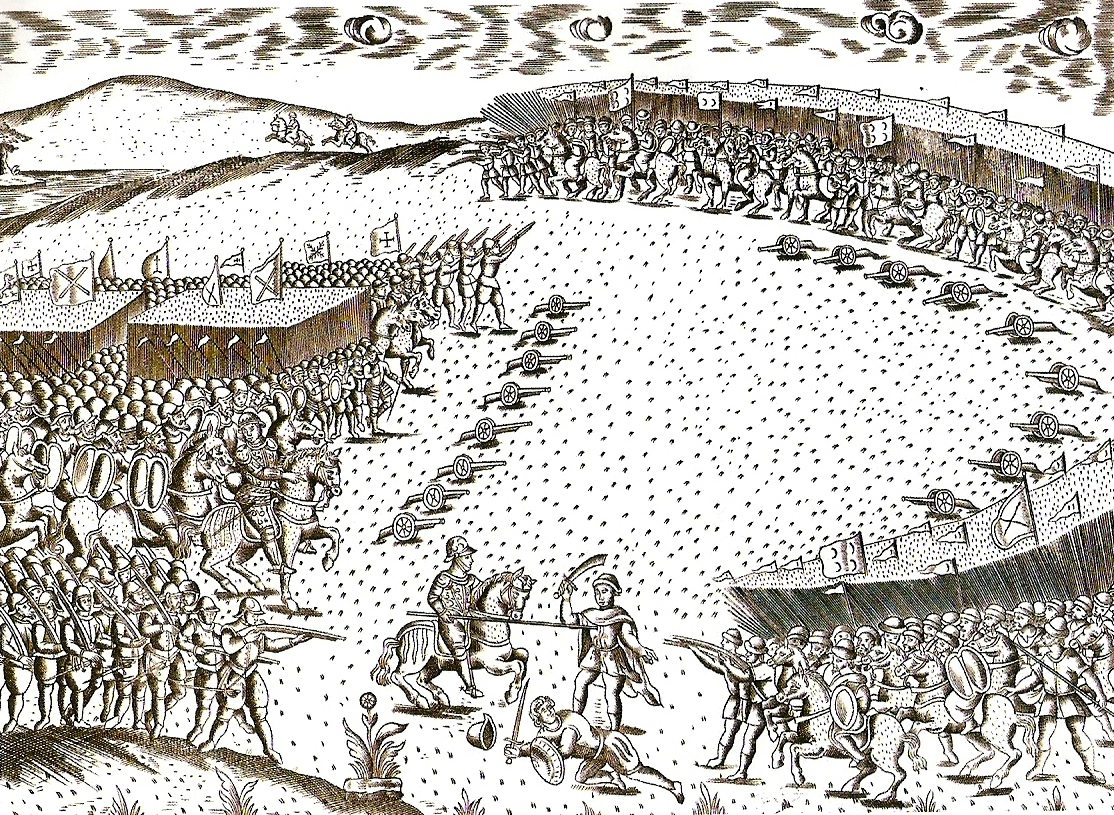
A Portuguese depiction of the 1578 Battle of Alcácer Quibir, published in 1629

The battle had immediate and long-term consequences. The most immediate result was the accession of Abd al-Malik's brother Ahmad to the throne of Morocco. Drawing on the prestige of the victory, he took on the regnal title (laqab) "al-Mansur". The capture of a large number of Portuguese knights and nobility resulted in a flurry of ransoms which drained Portugal's finances while filling the coffers of the Saadian state. This allowed the sultan to strike new and higher-quality gold coins, earning him the additional title "ad-Dhahabi" ("the Golden"). Meanwhile, King Sebastian's lack of an immediate heir led to a succession crisis that ultimately resulted in King Philip II of Spain annexing Portugal in 1580. In the long term, Morocco's international standing was greatly increased, giving it the status of a major regional power in the western Mediterranean. The subsequent 24-year reign of Ahmad al-Mansur, among the longest in Moroccan history, marked the apogee of Saadian power and wealth.

In the aftermath of the battle, Ahmad al-Mansur followed Abd al-Malik's example in organizing his army along Ottoman patterns, staffing it with officers and instructors from Ottoman Algeria or of other Ottoman background (many of them non-Turkish). One consequence of this was a widespread adoption of firearms and artillery in the Moroccan military, which aided Al-Mansur in his later conquests. Turkish titles and terms like beylerbey and sipahi were also used in the army. In addition to local troops from the Sous and various tribes, the army also included troops from the Algerian Zuwawa tribe, Andalusian recruits, and European mercenaries. Possibly to limit Turkish/Ottoman influence, Al-Mansur entrusted the highest military positions to Andalusians and Europeans, and also employed them as his personal guard on campaigns.

Al-Mansur's army, in turn, helped him ensure his absolute authority, turning the institution of government into a more dominant force across the country. He levied heavy taxes on people in order to support the largesse of his court and his construction projects, which attracted criticism from religious scholars, particularly the religious elites in Fes. Some Muslim scholars also criticized him for the elaborate ceremonialism he introduced at court, where he often remaining concealed behind a veil when receiving guests, imitating the seclusion of the old Abbasid caliphs. Nonetheless, the Saadians' status as sharifs, descendants of Muhammad, aided them in maintaining their legitimacy even in the face of this criticism. Al-Mansur also insisted on maintaining a highly efficient state administration and remained personally involved in the state's affairs. He was a patron of culture, sponsoring poets, musicians, scholars, and elaborate ceremonies for religious festivals such as the Mawlid (birthday of the Prophet) and Eid al-Fitr. Immediately after his accession in 1578 he began the construction of a monumental reception palace in the Kasbah of Marrakesh known as El Badi (Arabic: البديع, translated as "the Incomparable"), which was famous for its lavishness and expensive materials (including imported Italian marble) and which he likely continued to work on until his death. In addition to the heavy taxation and the ransoms extorted from the Portuguese nobility, the wealth of al-Mansur's reign was also due to the Saadians' control of the sugar trade. Morocco was at that time a significant exporter of sugar towards Europe, along with other products such as silk, copper, and leather.

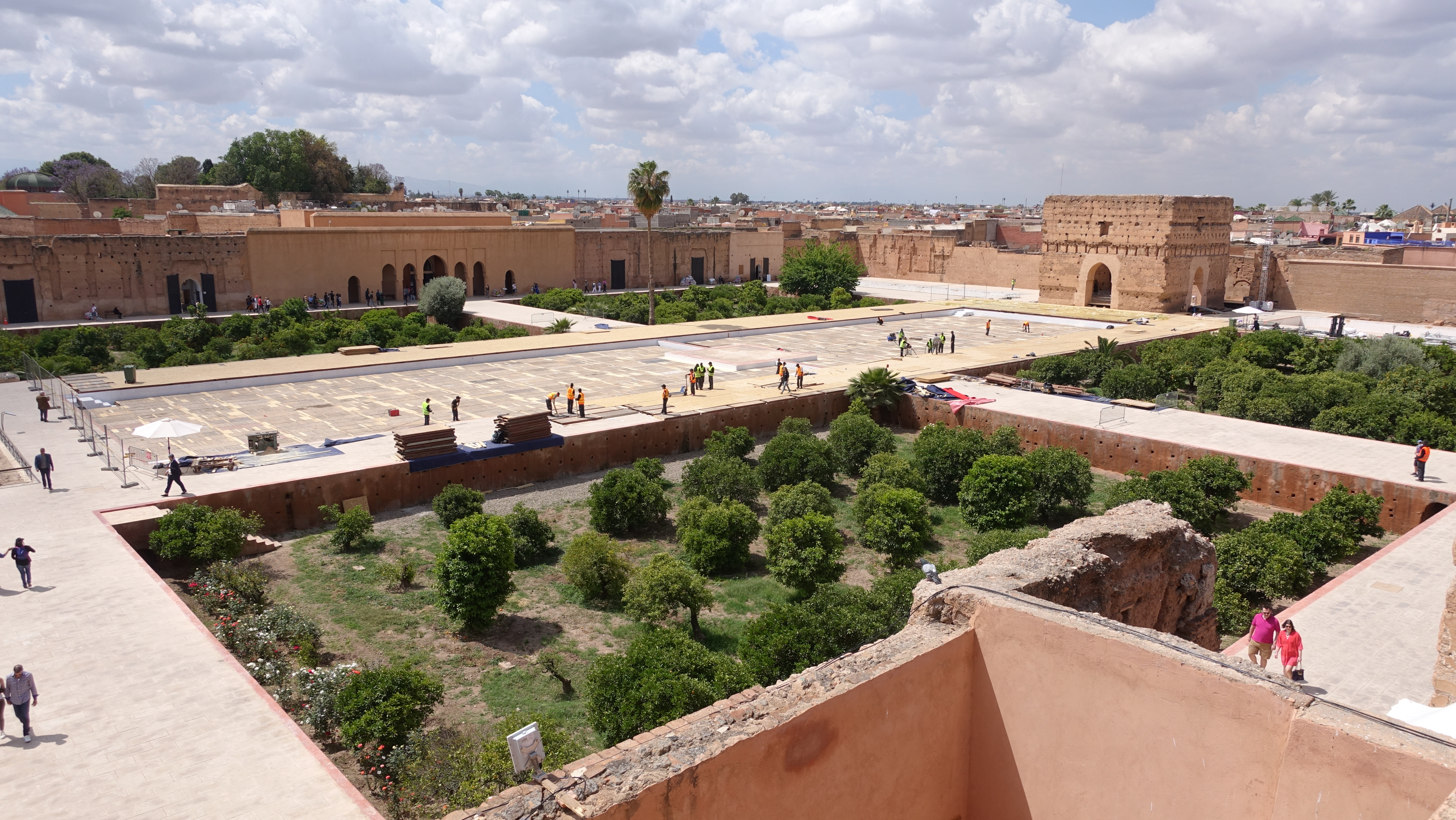
The remains of the El Badi Palace today in Marrakesh

Al-Mansur had ambivalent relations with the Ottoman Empire. At the very start of his reign he formally recognized the suzerainty of the Ottoman sultan, as Abd al-Malik had done, while still remaining de facto independent. However he quickly alienated the Ottoman sultan when he favorably received the Spanish embassy in 1579, who brought him lavish gifts, and then reportedly trampled the symbol of Ottoman suzerainty before a Spanish embassy in 1581. He also suspected that the Ottomans were involved in the first rebellions against him in his early reign. As a result, he minted coins in his own name and had Friday prayers delivered in his name instead of in the name of Murad III, the Ottoman sultan. In response to the removal of his name from Friday prayers, Murad III began preparations for an attack on Morocco. After getting word of this, Al-Mansur rushed to send an ambassador to Istanbul with sizeable gifts and the attack was cancelled. He paid a tribute of over 100,000 gold coins, agreed to show respect to the Ottoman sultan and in return he was left alone. The embassy nearly failed to reach Istanbul due to the opposition of Uluç (later known as Kılıç Ali Paşa), the Ottoman Grand Admiral in Algiers who hoped to have Morocco invaded and incorporated into Ottoman Algeria's sphere of influence. In 1582 Al-Mansur was also forced to agree to a special Ottoman "protection" over Morocco and to pay a certain tribute in order to stop the attacks from Algerian corsairs on the Moroccan coast and on Moroccan ships. In 1583, the Saadian and Ottoman sultans even tentatively discussed a joint military operation against the Spanish in Oran. Al-Mansur sent a payment to Istanbul every year, which the Saadians interpreted as a "gift" to the Ottomans while the Ottomans considered it a "tribute". He enjoyed peaceful relations with the Ottoman Empire afterwards and respected its sovereignty, but also played the Ottomans and European powers against each other and issued propaganda that undermined the Ottoman sultan's claim as leader of all Muslims. In 1587 Uluç died and a change in the Ottoman administration in Algiers limited the power of its governors. After this, tensions between the two states further decreased, while the Saadian government further stabilized and its independence became more entrenched. Al-Mansur even felt confident enough after 1587 to drop his regular payments to Murad III. Despite the evident limits of his rule, he officially proclaimed himself caliph in the later part of his reign, seeing himself as the rival, rather than subordinate, of the Ottomans, and even as the rightful leader of the Muslim world.

Al-Mansur would also pursue careful diplomatic relations with Europe. He was widely perceived as friendly to Spain, presumably seeing it as a counterweight to Ottoman influence and seeking to play the two against each other. Nonetheless, he also sought alternatives to Spain by pursuing relations with the northern European states. Most notably, he increased friendly relations with England when the latter made diplomatic overtures to him after 1580 with a view to find allies against Spain at the time. This led to the development of an Anglo-Moroccan alliance. Early relations focused on trade as English merchants, despite the objections of the Portuguese, had been trading in Morocco since the early 16th century. This trade initially consisted of English cloth for Moroccan sugar, but after 1572 the English learned that they could find saltpeter and mainly sought to obtain this material. At that time, Sultan al-Mutawakkil demanded cannonballs in exchange, and from this time on the English were often supplying the Saadians with weapons and military equipment. John Williams, the first English merchant to buy saltpeter in Morocco, was initially unable to obtain permission to provide the Moroccans with ammunition as Queen Elizabeth worried that this would invite resentment from other Christian states. However, after Spain's annexation of Portugal in 1580 the Queen accorded more importance to securing cordial relations with the Saadian sultan and in 1581 she allowed English naval timber to be exported to Morocco in return for saltpeter. John Symcot, an agent of the Earl of Leicester, was able to obtain in 1585 a royal charter to found the English Barbary Company, which managed the activities of English traders in Morocco and obtained trading privileges from the sultan. The English also attempted to convince Al-Mansur to support Don Antonio, the claimant to the Portuguese throne against the Spanish, but Al-Mansur was evasive in his responses. The exchanges were kept secret, allowing him to continue relations with Spain at the same time. In the last decade or so of his reign, however, Al-Mansur seemed to shift his views about an alliance with England. In 1595 he had been forced to suppress a dangerous rebellion in the north led by his nephew Al-Nasir, who had received some support from Spain. In 1600 Al-Mansur sent his Secretary Abd el-Ouahed ben Messaoud as ambassador to Elizabeth's court to negotiate a military alliance to invade Spain. In his letter to the Queen he even suggested a second option to invade Spanish colonies in the New World and expressed a desire for Morocco to colonize those territories if they were victorious. Elizabeth did not agree to either plan, but commercial relations continued to develop.

==== Conquest of the western Sudan under Al-Mansur ====
Al-Mansur's only major foreign military venture was the invasion of West Africa – or more particularly the western Sudan, as it was known in Arabic. This was likely motivated by a number of factors. Trans-Saharan trade had long been an important part of Morocco's place in international trade and the tax revenues from it had contributed to funding the Saadians ever since their early days in the Sous. The expansion of European trade routes around the whole coast of Africa, however, had undermined its importance and reduced the flow of gold across the desert. Thus Al-Mansur may have sought to increase his access to gold through direct control of the gold mines in the south. Saadian interest in the sugar trade may have also been a motivation, as control of the trans-Saharan trade routes also allowed him to increase Morocco's access to slaves – on which the sugar processing industry relied and which were necessary to compete with the prices of sugar coming from Brazil and the Caribbean (controlled by Europeans and also reliant on slaves). Finally, the invasion may have been a way for Al-Mansur to elevate his claim to being a universal Muslim ruler. Since expansion eastward into Ottoman territory had been unfruitful the only path left for Saadian expansion was to the south. This ambition may have been further encouraged by the embassies of Idris Alooma, the Mai (king) of the Kanem-Bornu Empire, who, having failed to secure support from the Ottoman Empire, expressed willingness to recognize Al-Mansur as caliph instead.

Saadian interest in the Sudan region preceded Al-Mansur. Earlier that century the Saadians occupied the oasis area of Touat for a time and Ahmad al-'Araj had asked Askia Ishaq I (r. 1539–1549), emperor of the Songhai Empire, to grant him control of the Taghaza salt mines. Since Al-Araj and his successors were preoccupied with challenges to the north, this claim was not pursued further. In 1583 or 1584, however, Al-Mansur brought the issue up again with Emperor Askia Dawud (r. 1549–1582), asking the latter to pay him the equivalent of the tax revenues generated from the mines. In 1583 Al-Mansur's forces successfully occupied the Touat and the Gourara oases. In 1589 or early 1590 he then asked Askia Ishaq II to pay him an amount of gold proportional to the amount of salt taken from the mines, which Ishaq II contemptuously refused.

The Saadian military expedition, numbering between 4,000 and 20,000 men, left Marrakesh on 16 October 1590 and reached the Niger River in February 1591. It was led by Judar Pasha, a commander of Spanish origin. The Saadian army suffered while crossing the desert, but Askia Ishaq II was surprised when they arrived and had to assemble his forces quickly. While the Songhai army was reportedly larger, it lacked firearms, unlike the Moroccans. At the Battle of Tondibi the Saadian army thus won a decisive victory. The Songhai evacuated their capital, Gao, and retreated south, while Judar Pasha's army occupied Gao along with Timbuktu (both in present-day Mali).

After this victory, however, the Moroccans struggled to have their authority accepted in the region and continued to wage a protracted war with the remnants of the defeated Songhai Empire. In the end, Moroccan control was tenuously established over a large region stretching between Kukiya (also spelled Koukya or Koukiya) and Djenné, around the northern curve of the Niger River. Dissension continued to undermine the Moroccan occupation afterwards but around the same time Nuhu was himself overthrown (in 1599) and the Dendi Kingdom fell into disorder for several years. While Saadian control of the region did not last long after Ahmad al-Mansur's death, the conquered region nonetheless sent a caravan of riches and supplies to Marrakesh every year during this period. It provided Al-Mansur's realm with abundant gold, slaves, and ivory, as well as exotic animals such as elephants for the first time. Saadian gold nonetheless had difficulty competing with the abundant high-quality gold shipped from the Spanish colonies in the Americas, and the caravans themselves were costly. A part of their function was to provide an impressive display to the inhabitants of Marrakesh and to the sultan's guests every year.

=== Decline ===
==== Succession war (1603–1627) ====
Al-Mansur's final years were marked by growing rivalries between his sons and by the plague, which arrived from Spain in 1597 and wrought severe destruction. Ahmad al-Mansur died of the plague himself on August 25, 1603. He had designated his son Muhammad al-Sheikh al-Ma'mun as his heir as early as 1579 and again in 1584, but he had also given all of his sons administrative roles during his reign. Upon his death in 1603, Al-Ma'mun's accession was immediately contested by his two brothers, Abu al-Ma'ali Zaydan al-Nasir (also known as Moulay Zaydan) and Abdallah al-Wathiq (also known as Abu Faris). Over the next 25 years the Saadian realm was split between a region ruled from Marrakesh and a region ruled from Fes, with the Sous sometimes also ruled separately, all of which changed hands between factions multiple times. Saadian authority outside these main centers of power was greatly diminished, and the trans-Saharan caravans from the south were sent to Marrakesh less frequently.

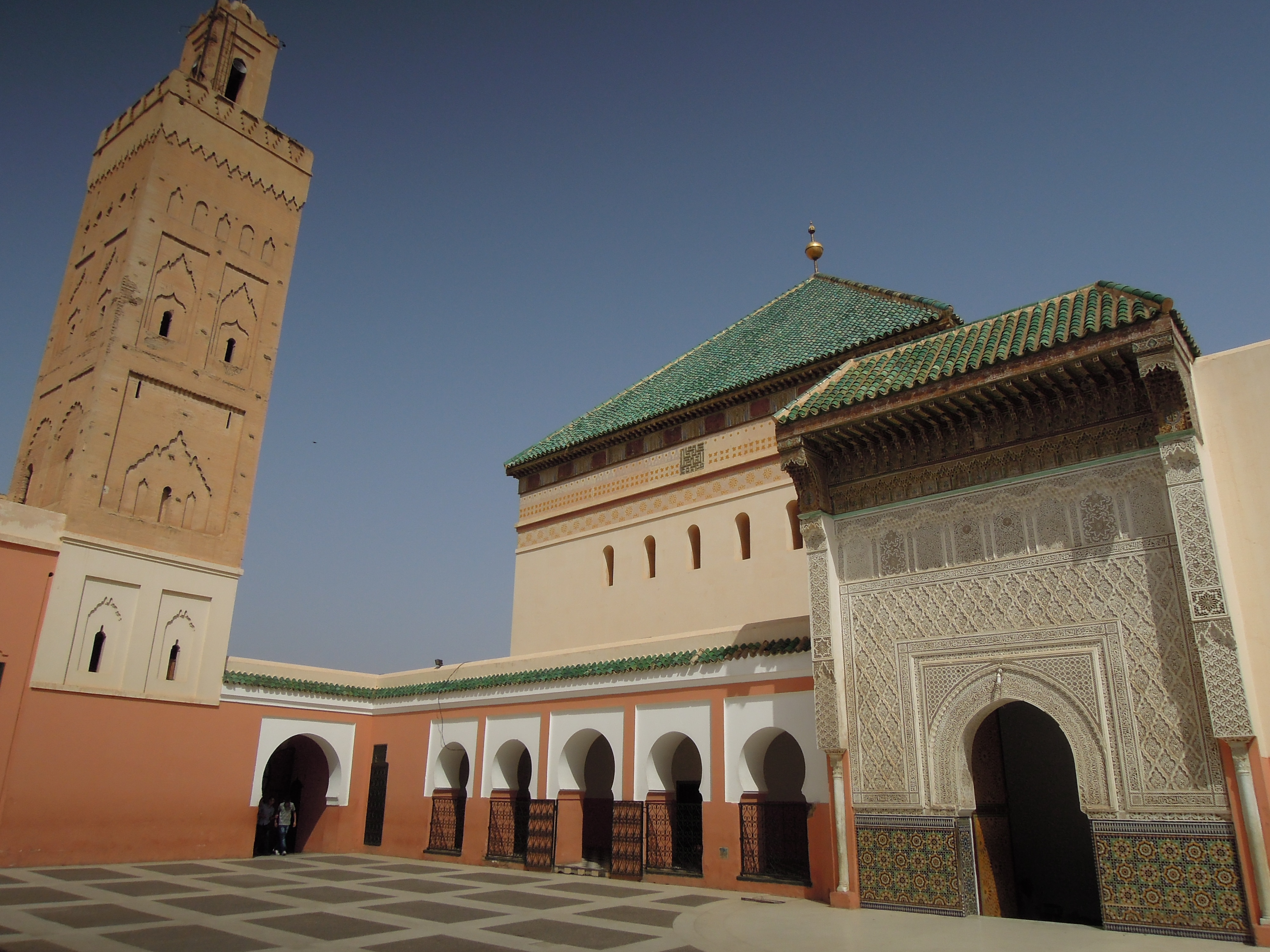
During his short reign in Marrakesh, Abu Faris built the mosque and mausoleum in the religious complex of Sidi Bel Abbès.

Abu Faris initially held Marrakesh until 1606 while Moulay Zaydan held Fes for a year before being defeated and expelled by Al-Ma'mun in 1604, who then ruled from Fes. In the period around 1606 Marrakesh changed hands especially frequently – as many as six times according to one source – but Abdallah al-Ghalib II, a son of Al-Ma'mun who now also claimed the throne, managed to hold it between 1606 and 1609. Al-Ma'mun himself, meanwhile, saw his position in Fes weaken and sought help from abroad. At first he solicited help from Tuscany but in the end he was forced to flee and seek refuge in Spain in March 1608. Moulay Zaydan, who had fled to the Sous after being expelled from Fes, retook Marrakesh in 1609 with the help of Ottoman, English, and Dutch weapons.

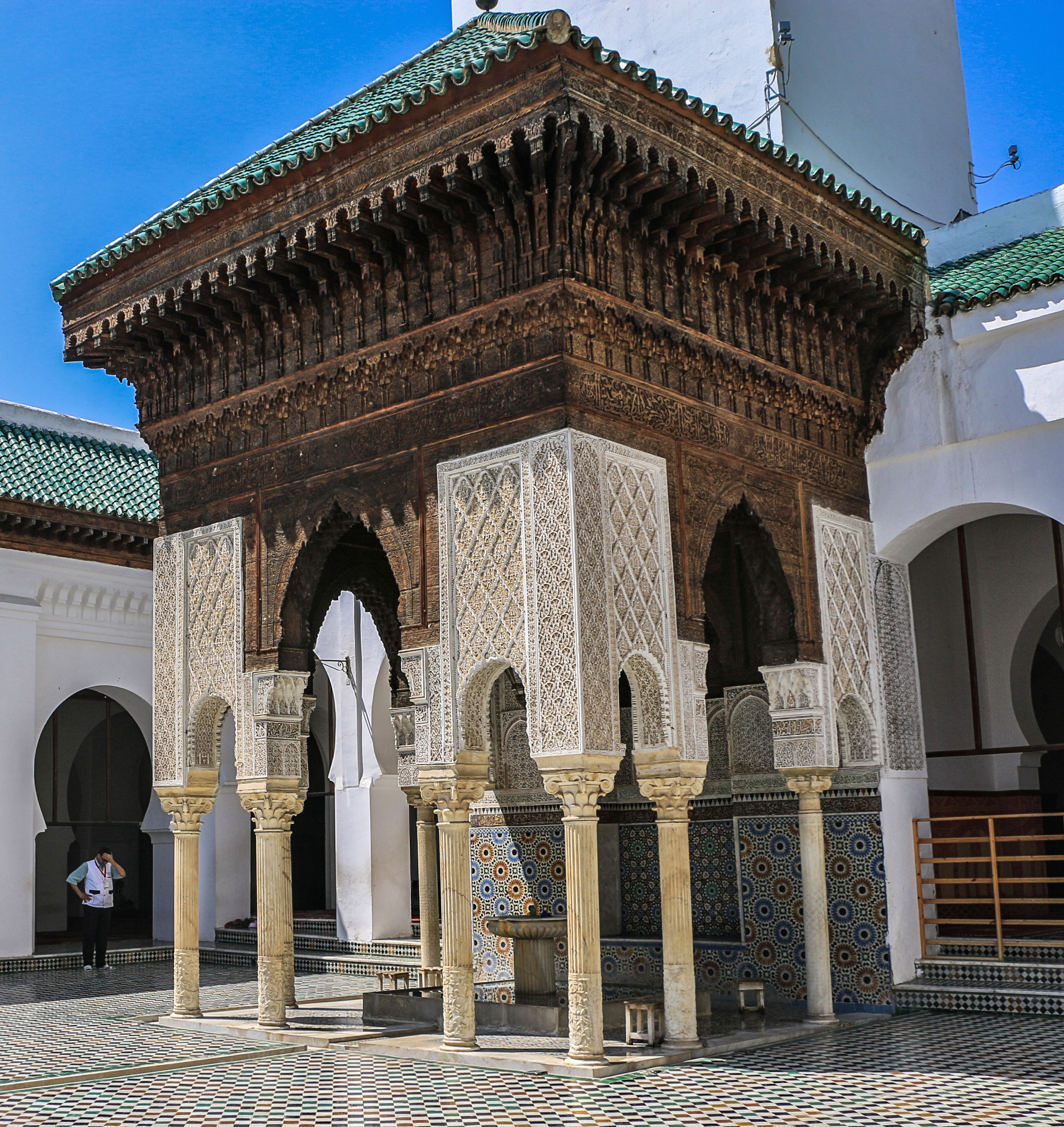
The ornate western pavilion in the courtyard of the Qarawiyyin Mosque in Fez was commissioned by Abdallah al-Ghalib II in 1609, after gaining control of the city.

Around the same time (in 1609), Abdallah al-Ghalib II had Abu Faris assassinated and took control of his father's former realm in Fes, which he ruled until 1623. Al-Ma'mun attempted to make a comeback by agreeing to cede the northern port city of Larache to Spain in return for Spanish military assistance. In November 1610 he landed in Larache with Spanish troops under the command of Marquis of San Germán and tried to intimidate the elites of Fes into recognizing him as ruler. However the plan backfired as his surrender of Moroccan territory to the Spanish instead cost himself and the wider Saadian dynasty a great deal of credibility. He was eventually assassinated in 1613. This left his son, Abdallah al-Ghalib II, as ruler of Fes and his brother, Moulay Zaydan, as ruler of Marrakesh.

Moulay Zaydan spent another year in exile between 1612 and 1613 after being expelled from Marrakesh by a local religious leader, Abu Mahalli, who rebelled against him. Abu Mahalli managed to occupy Marrakesh and declared himself the Mahdi, granting his rebellion a distinctive religious character. Moulay Zaydan fled to Safi. He was about to leave Morocco for Spain but was spared from doing so when he received the support of Yahya ibn Abdullah al-Hahi, a chieftain from the High Atlas Mountains, who helped him regain Marrakesh in 1613 with a coalition of Arab and Berber tribes.

When Abdallah al-Ghalib II died in 1623 his realm in Fes passed on to his brother Abd al-Malik al-Mu'tasim, another son of Al-Ma'mun. After the scandal of Al-Ma'mun's collusion with Spain, however, Moulay Zaydan was the only Saadian ruler left with any credibility in the country and he was recognized as Sultan of Morocco by multiple foreign powers. When both Moulay Zaydan and Abd al-Malik al-Mu'tasim died in 1627, the two Saadian splinter states in Marrakesh and Fes were finally reunified and inherited by Moulay Zaydan's son, Abu Marwan Abd al-Malik II, who ruled the country until 1631.

==== Reunification and final years ====
Abu Marwan Abd al-Malik II was in turn succeeded by his brother Muhammad al-Walid (r. 1631–1636), followed by his other brother Muhammad al-Shaykh al-Saghir (r. 1636–1655). By this time Saadian authority had greatly suffered. Moulay Zaydan had already relinquished direct control over the Sudan territories in 1618 when its governors ceased to be appointed from Marrakesh and were instead chosen by the local troops themselves. Thereafter the local Saadian regime became the Pashalik of Timbuktu, ruled by the Arma people, the mixed descendants of Moroccan soldiers and local inhabitants, who were nominally subject to Morocco until the early 19th century. The fragmentation and decline of strong central rule in the region also contributed to the decline of Timbuktu and the trans-Saharan trade routes, while European merchants increasingly diverted trade in the region through their own operations and networks. At the same time, the important sugar mills in the south of Morocco also declined and many of the mills outside the immediate vicinity of Taroudant stopped working.

Several centers of political opposition and dissent to the Saadians also became clear in this period. On the western coast, recent Morisco (Andalusian) exiles had arrived in Salé and Rabat in 1609 and eventually founded the Republic of Bou Regreg, becoming one of the most important bases of piracy in the region. In 1615 they also agreed to an alliance with Muhammad al-'Ayyashi, a religious warrior who started out as one of Moulay Zaydan's governors. As governor, Al-'Ayyashi had repeatedly attacked the Spanish at Mazagan (Al-Jadida). The Spanish persuaded Moulay Zaydan to rein him in and the sultan sent an army to stop him, at which point he fled north with his warriors. The Sous valley, meanwhile, had come under the leadership of 'Ali Abu Hassun al-Simlali in the town of Iligh since 1614. Abu Hassun fought with the forces of Moulay Zaydan's ally, Yahya ibn Abdullah al-Hahi, until the latter's death in 1626 left him uncontested in the Sous. He went on to conquer the Dra'a Valley and then as far Sijilmasa in the Tafilalt in 1631.

The Dala'iyya, an important Sufi brotherhood in the Middle Atlas, became the most important opposition, especially under Muhammad al-Hajj, who ruled them between 1636 and 1668. He organized the Berbers of the region into a regular army which defeated a Saadian army sent by Muhammad al-Shaykh al-Saghir to subdue them in 1638. In 1641 he also defeated Al-'Ayyashi with the help of Al-'Ayyashi's former allies, the Andalusians in Salé, who had turned against him. The Dala'iyya occupied the area but allowed the pirates to continue operating. That same year they also captured Fez. Thanks to these victories, they established a new Berber state across a large area, and even conducted foreign relations, especially with the Dutch, with whom they signed a treaty in 1651.

The last Saadian sultan was Ahmad al-Abbas, the son of Muhammad al-Shaykh al-Saghir, who inherited a reduced state from his father in 1655. As a child, he was placed under the tutelage of his mother's tribe, before being was assassinated and usurped by his maternal uncle in 1658 or 1659, bringing Saadian rule officially to an end. Eventually, a new Sharifian dynasty, the 'Alawis from the Tafilalt, defeated all other factions to become the sole rulers of Morocco. The first effective 'Alawi sultan, Moulay Rashid, conquered Marrakesh in 1668.

=== Chronological summary ===
- 1510: Saadian chief Al-Qa'im recognized as leader of the Sous
- 1513: Al-Qa'im moves his base to Afughal, the burial place of Al-Jazuli
- 1517: Al-Qa'im dies; Saadian realm divided between his sons Ahmad al-'Araj and Muhammad al-Shaykh
- 1524 or 1525: Ahmad al-'Araj takes control of Marrakesh
- 1527: Wattasids recognize Saadian rule over southern Morocco through the Treaty of Tadla
- 1536: Saadians defeat Wattasid army at Wadi al-'Abid
- 1541: Saadians expel the Portuguese from Agadir
- 1543: Muhammad al-Shaykh exiles his brother Ahmad al-'Araj to the Tafilalt and becomes sole Saadian ruler
- 1549: Muhammad al-Shaykh conquers Fes and expels the Wattasids
- 1554 (January): 'Ali Abu Hassun, a Wattasid, retakes Fes with Ottoman help
- 1554 (September): Muhammay al-Shaykh conquers Fes again, putting a permanent end to Wattasid rule
- 1557: Muhammad al-Shaykh assassinated by Ottoman agent
- 1557–1574: Reign of Moulay Abdallah al-Ghalib
- 1576: Muhammad II al-Mutawakkil, Al-Ghalib's successor, is overthrown by his uncle Abd al-Malik, with Ottoman help
- 1578: Battle of Alcácer Quibir (also known as Battle of the Three Kings), with Saadian victory over the Portuguese army; reign of Ahmad al-Mansur begins
- 1583: Saadian conquest of the Touat oases
- 1591: Saadian invasion of the western Sudan region; Battle of Tondibi and defeat of the Songhai Empire
- 1603: Death of Ahmad al-Mansur; civil war breaks out among his three sons, Moulay Zaydan, Abu Faris, and Al-Ma'mun; Saadian realm is split between different factions, with Marrakesh and Fes changing hands multiple times
- 1609–1627: Moulay Zaydan rules in Marrakesh while the sons of Al-Ma'mun rule a rival kingdom in Fes
- 1627: Saadian realm is reunified under Abd al-Malik II, Moulay Zaydan's son, but decline of Saadian authority in Morocco continues
- 1659: Last Saadian sultan, Ahmad al-Abbas, is killed, ending the Saadian dynasty

== Society ==
=== Population ===
The 16th century during which the Saadians rose to power also saw many social and demographic changes in Morocco. The existing population was joined by large waves of emigrants and refugees from the Iberian Peninsula after the fall of Granada in 1492, the last Muslim emirate of Al-Andalus, and the subsequent expulsion of the Jews from Spain and soon after from Portugal. At the beginning of the century around 100,000 Andalusi Muslims and Jews settled in the country as a result, and were followed by another 20,000 to 30,000 around a century later when Spain began expelling the Moriscos. The Andalusi arrivals revitalized many of the country's northern cities, with notable examples like Tétouan.

The arrival of large numbers of Sephardic Jews from the Iberian Peninsula also had a profound impact on the Jewish community in Morocco and North Africa. It increased the Jewish population and revitalized Jewish cultural activity, while also splitting the community along ethnic lines for many generations. In Fez, for example, the Megorashim of Spanish origin retained their heritage and their Spanish language while the indigenous Moroccan Toshavim, who spoke Arabic and were of Arab and Berber heritage, followed their own traditions. Members of the two communities worshiped in separate synagogues and were even buried separately. It was only in the 18th century that the two communities eventually blended together, with Arabic eventually becoming the main language of the entire community while the Spanish (Sephardic) minhag became dominant in religious practice; a situation which was repeated elsewhere in Morocco, with the notable exception of the Marrakesh community.

In addition to the Andalusians and Moriscos, other foreigners arrived due to varying geopolitical and military factors. There is a documented presence of relatively large numbers of Christian European captives resulting from Saadian victories against the Portuguese. By the end of the 16th century, during the reign of Ahmad al-Mansur, there were about 2000 of them in Marrakesh, the capital. Many of them worked on the sultan's construction projects or in the production of armaments, where European expertise was valued. Saadian expansionism across the Sahara and into the Niger River region also meant an influx of thousands of Black sub-Saharan Africans as slaves or captives. Lastly, due to Ottoman expansion in the region and growing Ottoman-Saadian relations, there were also many Turkish or Ottoman mercenaries and soldiers of fortune. Many of these new arrivals were recruited in the service of the state or tied to the state's operations. After the collapse of the Saadian state many would go on to play independent roles, sometimes as outlaws or, in the case of the Moriscos in Salé for example, as corsairs.

=== The role of the Sultan's government ===
Possible appearance of the banner (al-'alam al-mansûr) used by the Saadi sultanate, according to Nabil Mouline

At the height of Saadian power, especially under Ahmad al-Mansur, the authority of the central government in Morocco became more absolute. The presence of the central government made itself felt in the lives of everyday Moroccans in a way that that had not been true under previous dynasties and rulers. This marked a new stage in the development of the Makhzen (Arabic: مخزن), the royal or sultanic government in Morocco. The word makhzen itself literally meant "warehouse" or storage, referring to the role the traditional state played as a guarantor of food and provisions in times of famine or crisis. From the Saadian period onward, however, the word's more abstract meaning as the authority and power of the sultan's government came to the fore. Hand in hand with this development was an increasingly strong association between the status of sovereign ruler and the status of sharif (descendant of Muhammad), which eventually became irreversible under the following 'Alawi dynasty. This became apparent also in the use of the word Moulay (from Moroccan Arabic, meaning "my master") becoming a standard part of the sultan's name and title.

=== Beginnings of Moroccan national identity ===
Some scholars argue that the Saadian period marks the beginning of the formation of a modern Moroccan national identity, similar to some of the processes happening in early modern Europe around the same time. In particular, territorial borders became more clearly defined and more closely resembled Morocco's modern borders, while the inhabitants of the territory began to more clearly identify themselves as belonging to a country distinct from its neighbours. Rivet also notes that around this time the name "Morocco", derived from the name of Marrakesh via Spanish Marruecos, became more commonly used abroad to designate the country. Mercedes Garcia-Arenal also argues that the beginnings of modern Morocco can be traced to Ahmad al-Mansur's reign, when Morocco engaged in regular diplomacy with other states and was recognized on the international scene as a significant regional power.

== Culture ==
=== Architecture ===
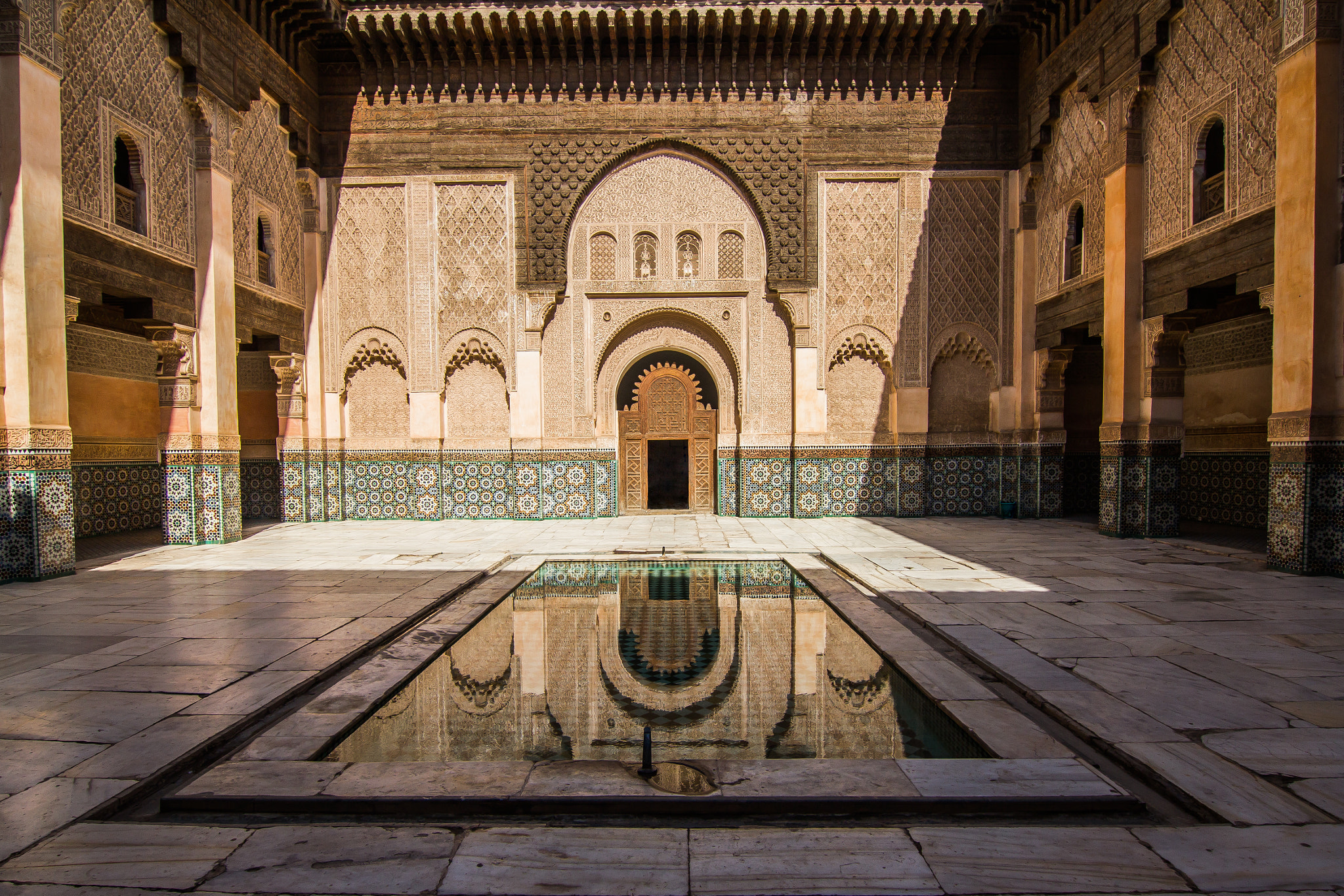
Ben Youssef Madrasa in Marrakesh, built by Sultan Abdallah al-Ghalib, completed in 1564-65 CE

While the Saadian dynasty marked a political shift from previous Berber-led empires to sultanates led by Arab sharifian dynasties, artistically and architecturally there was broad continuity between these periods. The Saadians are seen by modern scholars as continuing to refine the existing Moroccan-Moorish style, with some seeing Saadian art as the last "renaissance" of this style and the Saadian Tombs in Marrakesh as one of its apogees. Other major examples of this Saadian style which survive today include the ornate Ben Youssef Madrasa in Marrakesh and the ablutions pavilions in the courtyard (sahn) of the Qarawiyyin Mosque in Fes. The Saadians also rebuilt the royal palace complex in the Kasbah of Marrakesh to suit their own needs, though little of this survives. Ahmad al-Mansur famously constructed the extremely lavish reception palace known as El Badi, for which he also imported significant quantities of Italian marble.

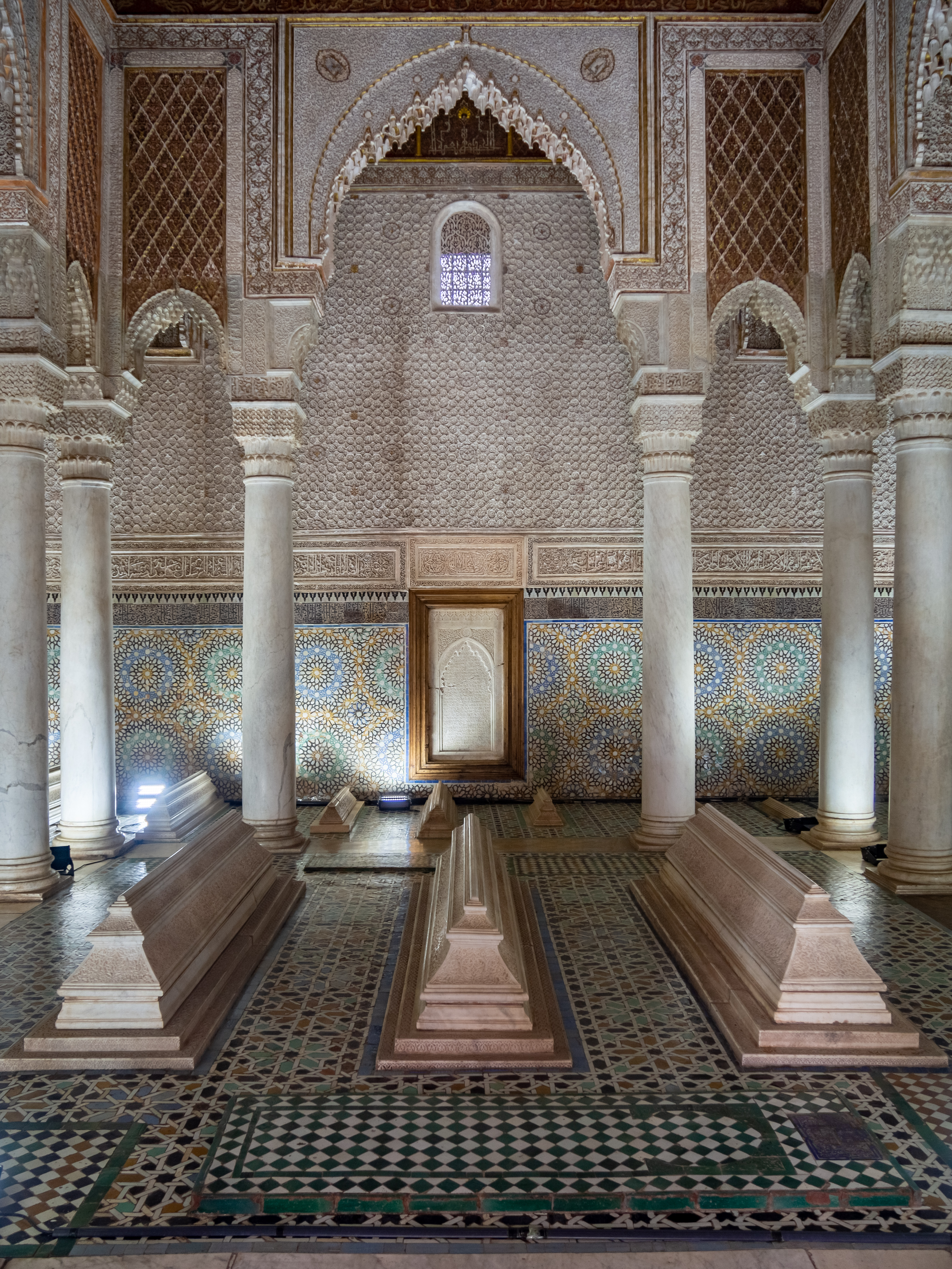
The Saadian Tombs in Marrakesh, mausoleum chamber of Ahmad al-Mansur

In terms of religious architecture, the Mouassine Mosque and the Bab Doukkala Mosque of Marrakesh were built under the reign of Moulay Abdallah al-Ghalib and are notable for the fact that they were designed as part of larger civic complexes designed to serve local residents, similar to contemporary Ottoman külliyes and the earlier Mamluk architecture in Egypt. These complexes included various institutions and amenities such as a madrasa, a library, a primary school, a hammam (public bathhouse), an ablutions house (mida'a) with latrines, a water trough for animals, and a public fountain for distributing water to locals. The Saadians also contributed to founding, building, or expanding the zawiyas (religious complexes centered around a tomb) of major Sufi shrines in Marrakesh, including the Zawiya of Sidi Ben Sliman al-Jazuli and the Zawiya of Sidi Bel Abbes.

In the 16th century and in subsequent centuries the usage of zellij, which became standard during the previous Marinid period, became even more widespread and ubiquitous as architectural decoration, usually along the lower walls of chambers. Under the Saadians the complexity of geometric patterns increased in part through the use of even finer (thinner) mosaic pieces for certain compositions, though in some cases this came at the expense of more colours. The zellij compositions in the Saadian Tombs are considered one of the best examples of this type. A panel constituting another fine example of this style, originating from the Badi Palace, is also preserved today in the collection of the Dar Batha Museum in Fes.

Starting with the Saadians, and continuing with the 'Alawis (their successors and the reigning monarchy today), Moroccan art and architecture is presented by modern scholars as having remained essentially "conservative"; meaning that it continued to reproduce the existing style with high fidelity but did not introduce major new innovations. Ornate architectural elements from Saadian buildings, most famously from the El Badi Palace, were also stripped and reused in buildings elsewhere during the reign of the 'Alawi sultan Moulay Isma'il (1672–1727). Saadian carved marble, in the form of columns, panels, and window frames, was especially prized and is found in multiple 'Alawi-era monuments in Meknes and Fes. The Saadian Tombs continued to be used as a necropolis for a time but were eventually abandoned, before being "rediscovered" by French authorities in 1917.

=== Manuscripts and calligraphy ===
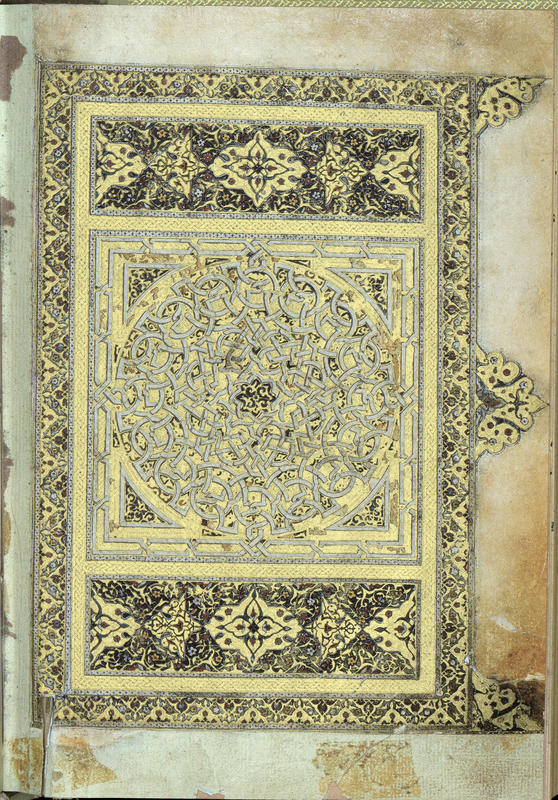
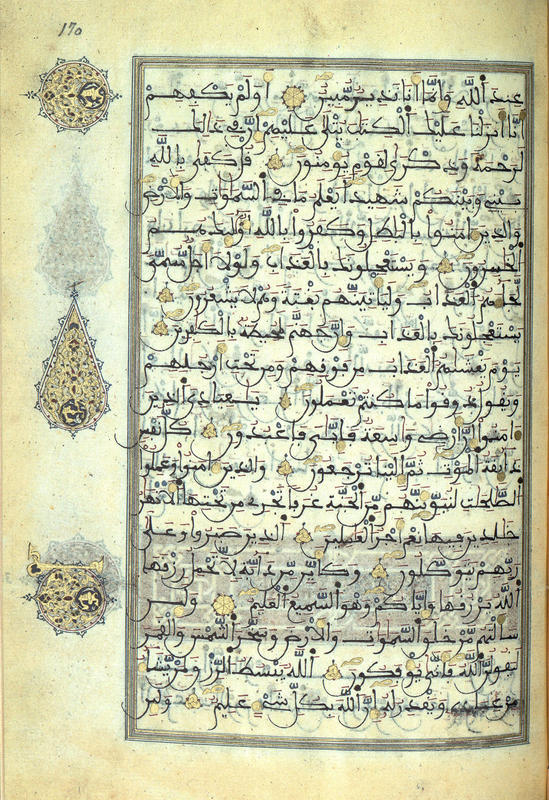
Pages from the so-called Qur'an of Moulay Zaydan, commissioned by Ahmad al-Mansur in 1599, kept at the library of El Escorial in Spain

Relatively little is known of Saadian-period art beyond architecture, with the relative exception of decorated manuscripts. Western Maghrebi books, including Qur'ans, had by this point established a calligraphic tradition of writing in the Maghrebi script, which continued well after the medieval (pre-16th century) era. The Saadian sultans were also responsible for compiling large libraries, a practice that became especially marked during the long and prosperous reign of Ahmad al-Mansur. Al-Mansur's increased relations with the Ottoman Empire, particularly during the reign of Mehmed III (1595–1603), resulted in numerous embassies to the Ottoman court which exchanged gifts, including richly produced Qur'an manuscripts. Older manuscripts produced in Al-Andalus were seen as especially dignified gifts and many such examples in the library of Topkapi Palace today may have come from Saadian embassies. In return, the Saadian libraries acquired an even larger number of Ottoman or Middle Eastern manuscripts, some of which remain in Moroccan royal libraries today. Another major and important collection of royal manuscripts, the Zaydani Library, was taken from Sultan Moulay Zaydan by the Spanish in 1612 and has been kept in the library of El Escorial up to the present day. Among other volumes, it contains a richly produced royal Qur'an dated to 1599, commissioned by Ahmad al-Mansur but known as the Qur'an of Moulay Zaydan (or Koran de Muley Zaidan in Spanish).

Another richly decorated royal Qur'an, written for Sultan Abdallah al-Ghalib and dated to 1568, is kept by the British Library. Although the script was written generally in black ink, various orthographic signs (such as vowels and diacritics) were written in red, blue, or orange. Chapter headings were in gold Kufic (a practice widely used in illuminated Qur'an), with the empty spaces between or within letters filled with blue. This multi-colouring practice is widely found in historic Qur'an copies from this region and traces its origins to Abbasid manuscripts. Blue and gold ornamentation, consisting of specific shapes filled with arabesque motifs, is also painted in the margins to mark other divisions in the text: ornate palmettes marked chapter divisions, roundels marked every ten verses, and teardrop shapes marked every five verses. The beginning and end of the manuscript are decorated with illuminated interlacing motifs similar to that seen in some Andalusi examples centuries earlier.

The increased cultural contacts with the Ottoman Empire are also apparent in the experimentation of Maghrebi authors with eastern traditions of manuscript production and calligraphy. For example, the use of thuluth, an eastern script adapted into a regional variation known as Maghrebi thuluth, was used in Marinid and Nasrid art (13th-15th centuries) or even earlier. However, in the late 16th century it became more systematized in manuscripts, often used for important words or for illuminated titles. Additionally, the repertoire of decorative motifs drew in Ottoman influences by increasing the use of vegetal and especially floral motifs, while geometric motifs, formerly dominant, were less emphasized. The most iconic Ottoman floral motif, the tulip, began to be adapted to Maghrebi manuscripts starting in the 17th century. Nonetheless, while manuscript art of this period showed a greater openness to outside influences, the Andalusi-Maghrebi artistic traditions established since the Almohad period (12th-13th centuries) were essentially preserved and perpetuated until the 19th century.

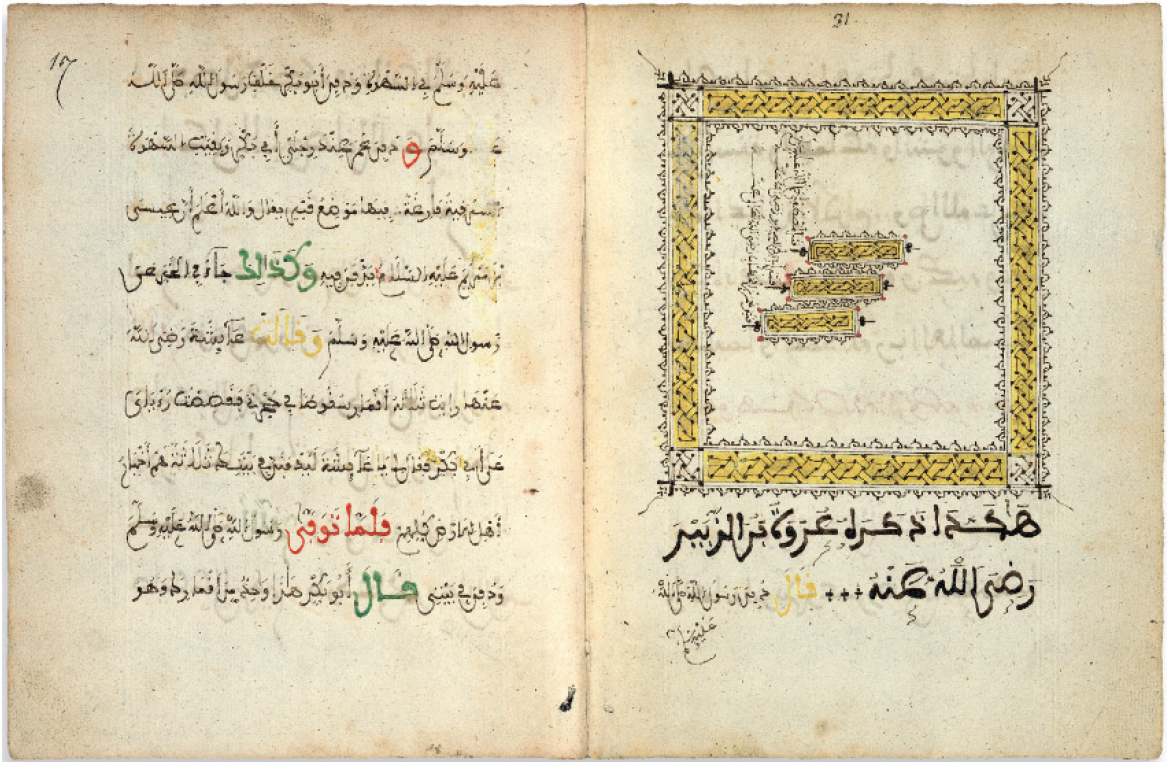
A copy of the Dala'il al-Khayrat by al-Jazuli, dated to 1599. The page on the right contains a schematic representation of the tombs of Muhammad, Abu Bakr, and 'Umar in Medina.

After the Qur'an, the most popular text transcribed in this period was the Dala'il al-Khayrat, a collection of prayers for Muhammad, composed by Muhammad ibn Sulayman al-Jazuli (also known as Sidi Ben Sliman or simply al-Jazuli), a Sufi figure of Berber origin from the Sous region. Some of the oldest known manuscripts of this text were produced in the 16th century and subsequently made their way as far as India and Afghanistan.

== Military ==
The Saadian military was a composite force consisting of permanent troops maintained by the Makhzen, provincial garrisons and larger tribal contingents mobilized for individual campaigns. The original military nucleus of the dynasty was formed principally from the Jazula of the Souss and Arab tribes belonging to the Banu Ma'qil confederation. These forces enabled the early Saadian rulers to oppose the Portuguese presence on the Atlantic coast, defeat the Wattasids and extend their authority from southern Morocco to Marrakesh and Fez.

Under Abdallah al-Ghalib, the principal ethnic and regional groupings of the army were organized into separate corps, including the Jazula, Arab tribes, Andalusians, European converts, the Kabyle Zouaoua, the Haratin and troops of sub-Saharan African origin. During the reign of Ahmad al-Mansur, the principal regular formations were the Ahl Sous, the Cheraga, the Andalusians and the European converts. The Ahl Sous corps contained both Arab and Amazigh groups, including the Oulad Jerrar, Oulad Mta'a, Cherarda, Rahamna and Haskima. The Cheraga corps was similarly composed of Arab, Arabized and Amazigh tribes from eastern and central Morocco, including branches of the Hilali tribes such as the Ashja', Banu Amir and Riyah.

The Cheraga formed one of the principal salaried corps and included a large body of soldiers armed with firearms. During one rebellion against al-Mansur, more than 5,000 Cheraga firearm-bearers defected together, demonstrating that Arab and Arabized tribal elements constituted a major part of the Saadian gunpowder forces. The regular army also contained mounted and dismounted arquebusiers, while the royal guard and other salaried formations were increasingly equipped with matchlock firearms. These troops received wages, land grants or exemptions from taxation and were more directly dependent upon the sultan than ordinary tribal levies.

Alongside these regular corps, the sultans mobilized the irregular tribal cavalry known collectively as the Arabs of the State (عرب الدولة). Its principal contingents included the Oulad Mta'a, Oulad Jerrar, Shbanat, Oulad Bou Aziz, Oulad al-Azafi, Oulad Imran, Abda, Chiadma, Manabha, Sufyan and Khlot. Individual tribes could reportedly supply between 1,500 and 9,000 horsemen, while approximately 29,000 to 30,000 tribal cavalry could be assembled for an important royal campaign. These cavalrymen carried lances, swords and shields, while wealthier warriors also possessed helmets and mail armour. Unlike the salaried firearm corps, they normally provided their own weapons, horses and equipment.

Artillery formed a separate professional branch. The first recorded Saadian culverin was cast at Marrakesh in 1539 by a Morisco craftsman from Madrid. Cannon and gunpowder were subsequently manufactured at Marrakesh, Fez and Taroudant, and the army possessed field, siege and fortress artillery. The gunners were most frequently European converts and Ottomans, while local artisans, Moriscos, European captives and foreign specialists worked in the foundries and arsenals.

== List of Rulers ==
=== 1510–49: Rise to power ===
- Muhammad ibn Abd al-Rahman Abu Abdallah al-Qaim (1510–17)
- Ahmad al-Araj (1517–44)
- Muhammad al-Shaykh (1544–49; viceroy in the Sous before 1543–44)

=== 1549–1603: Sultans of Morocco ===
- Muhammad al-Shaykh (1549–57)
- Abdallah al-Ghalib (1557–74)
- Abu Abdallah Mohammed II al-Mutawakkil (1574–76)
- Abu Marwan Abd al-Malik I (1576–78)
- Ahmad al-Mansur (1578–1603)

=== 1603–27: Succession war ===
Ruling from Marrakesh:

- Abu Faris Abdallah al-Wathiq (1603–1606; in Fez after 1606)
- (In 1606 control of the city changes from one side to another six times.)
- Abdallah al-Ghalib II, son of Muhammad al-Sheikh al-Ma'mun (1606–1609; in Fez after 1609)
- Abu al-Ma'ali Zaydan al-Nasir (1609–1627; in Fez and Sous before 1609, expelled from Marrakesh by local rebel leader between 1612 and 1613)

Ruling from Fes:

- Abu al-Ma'ali Zaydan al-Nasir (1603–1604; ruled in Fez and Tlemcen until defeated by al-Ma'mun in 1604, ruled in the Sous from 1604 to 1609, and ruled in Marrakesh after 1609)
- Muhammad al-Sheikh al-Ma'mun (1604–1606, contested until 1613; established power in Fes in 1604 but his position weakened and he fled to Spain in 1608; he returned with Spanish aid in 1610, but lost support until he was assassinated in 1613)
- Abu Faris Abdallah al-Wathiq (1606–1609) (Note: The status of Abu Faris in Fes is not fully clear from the sources cited here. In general, the transition and exact timing between the reigns of Al-Ma'mun and Abu Faris in Fes is not clearly indicated. According to the Encyclopedia of Islam (as cited in-text: Véronne (2012), "Saʿdids"), Abu Faris was eventually strangled on the orders of Abdallah al-Ghalib II in 1609, and Bosworth's "The New Islamic Dynasties" (2004) indicates that the latter then ruled in Fes after 1609.)
- Abdallah al-Ghalib II, son of Muhammad al-Sheikh al-Ma'mun (1609–1623; ruled in Marrakesh before 1609)
- Abd al-Malik al-Mu'tasim, son of Muhammad al-Sheikh al-Ma'mun (1623–1627)

=== 1627–59: Reunified rule and decline ===
- Abu Marwan Abd al-Malik II (1627–31)
- Muhammad al-Walid (1631–36)
- Muhammad al-Sheikh al-Saghir (1636–55)
- Ahmad al-Abbas (1655–59)

== See also ==
- Conflicts between the Regency of Algiers and Morocco
- History of Morocco
- List of Sunni Muslim dynasties
