= Brahim Vargas =

- Born: Hornachos
- Occupations: Politician, Pirate
- Era: Late 16th century and 17th century
- Known for: First governor of Republic of Salé

Brahim Vargas (Born in Hornachos), was the son of an old Morisco Corregidor from Hornachos and one of the Moriscos that anticipated the expulsion decreed by Philip III and left his homeland in 1609 to go to Rabat, he later became a famous politician and barbary corsair but also the first governor of the independent Republic of Salé, he made the old city of rabat very rich and prosperous during his rule through piracy, trade with Spain, Britain and other Mediterranean countries.

Brahim Vargas built a large fleet of Galleons that was feared even by major naval powers of the time.

He initially embraced Christianity shortly after arriving to Rabat, before converting to Islam and his descendants became Bargach family of Rabat which were a very influential family in the city.
