= Battle of Larache (1631) =

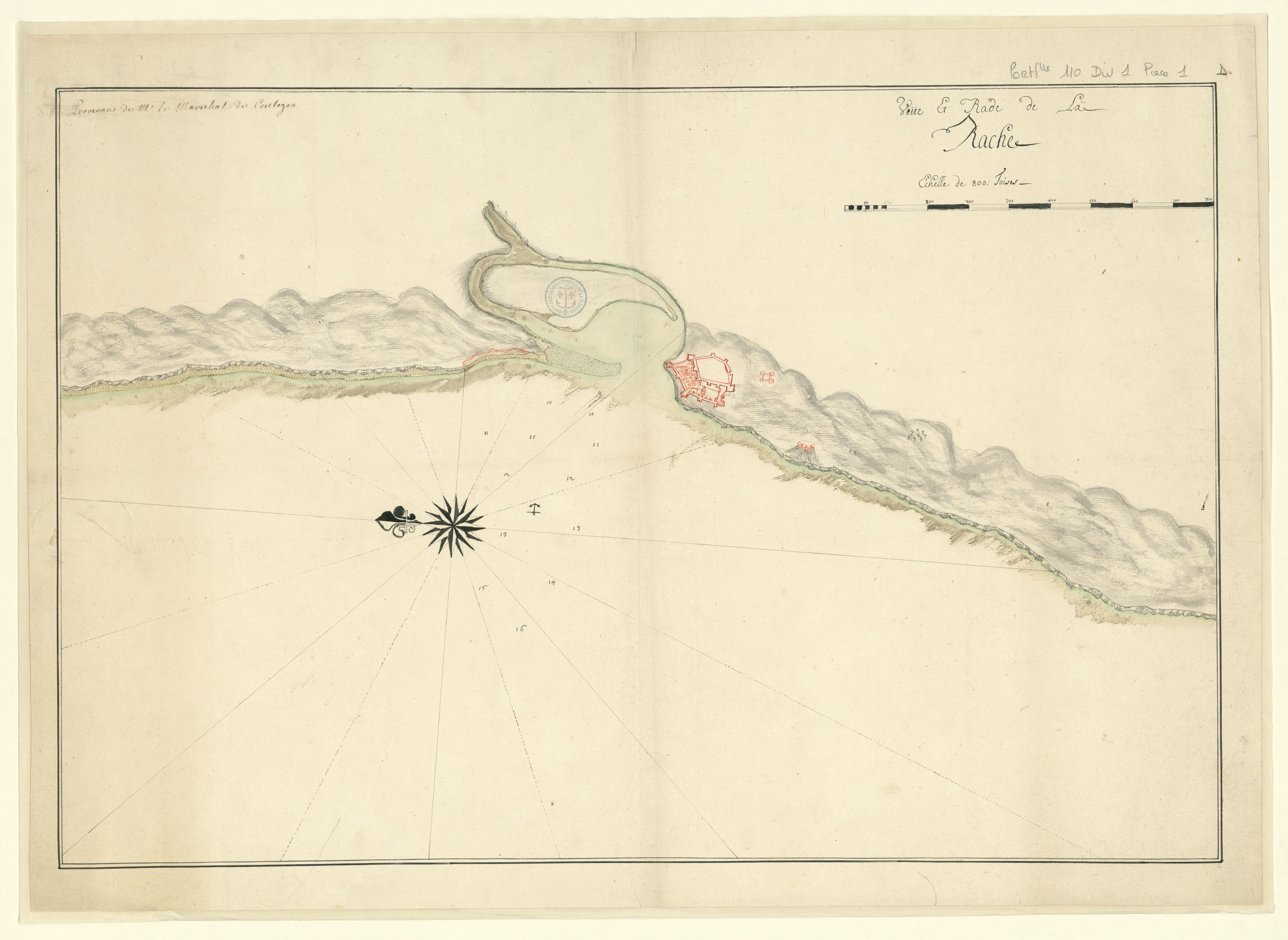
- Larache fortress in 17th century
Date	7 February 1631
Location	Larache, Morocco
Result	Moroccan victory

Belligerents
Kingdom of Spain	Republic of Salé

Commanders and leaders
(Spain) Diego Ruiz de Colmenares (DOW)	Sidi M'Hamed al-Ayachi

Strength
600 men	Unknown

Casualties and losses
436 or 600 killed	Unknown

The Battle of Larache occurred on February 7, 1631, when the forces of Sidi M'hamed el-Ayachi ambushed a detachment of the Spanish garrison of Larache.

== Background ==
On January 27, 1605, during a civil war in Morocco, the Moroccan sultan, Mohammed esh Sheikh el Mamun, was defeated by his brother, Zidan Abu Maali. Mohammed took refuge in Spain afterward. There he signed a treaty with Philip III of Spain, whereby he obtained military support in return for ceding the northern Moroccan port of Larache. At the time of the expulsion of Moriscos from Spain, Sidi al-Ayachi rose in fame, devouring himself to launch a holy war against the Christians. In April 1627, Sidi al-Ayachi revolted against the sultan and attacked the harbor of Salé, which he captured and transformed into his principality, the Republic of Salé, becoming its independent governor. al-Ayachi began attacking the Spanish areas in Morocco. In Larache, he managed to capture a spy named Ibn Aboud. Al-Ayachi ordered his execution, but Ibn Aboud begged for support in exchange for his life.

== Battle ==
al-Ayachi then dispatched Ibn Aboud to Larache to lure the Spanish out of town. Ibn Aboud reported that a group of Arab tribes were camping on a hill close to the town, and a potential attack would result in a large amount of loot. The Spanish immediately left the town. Diego Ruiz de Colmenares led the Spanish troops of around 600 men. The troops of al-Ayachi surrounded the Spanish troops and massacred them. Diego was wounded in the battle and died later on. The Spanish troops suffered 436 casualties, or the entire force was killed. The ambush took place on February 7, 1631.

== Sources ==
- Henry de Castries (1911), Unpublished sources of Moroccan history. Archives and libraries of France. Volume III.
- Mohammed al-Ifrani, History of the Saadian dynasty in Morocco: 1511–1670.
- Tomás García Figueras & Carlos Rodríguez Joulia Saint-Cyr (1973), Larache: datos para su historia en el siglo XVII.
