= Alonso de Contreras =

Spanish sailor, soldier, adventurer and writer

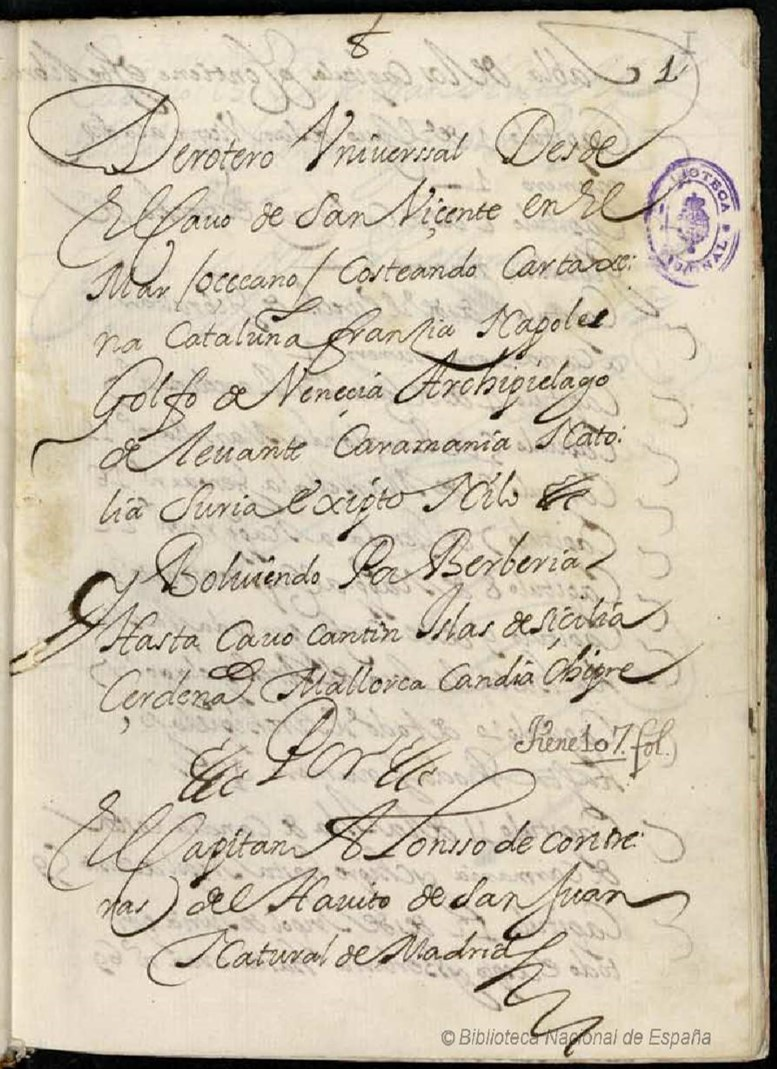

Alonso de Contreras (Madrid, Spain, 6 January 1582 - 1641) was a Spanish soldier, spy, privateer, and writer, best known as the author of his autobiography; one of the very few autobiographies of Spanish soldiers under the Spanish Habsburgs and possibly one of the finest, together with the True History of the Conquest of New Spain (Historia Verdadera de la Conquista de la Nueva España) by Bernal Diaz del Castillo.

He applied to different military forces to escape various crimes during his life, carving a career as a privateer and royal agent. During his first years he ventured into the waters of the Ottoman Empire, often with minor ships and crews, capitalizing on the changed strategic landscape after the Battle of Lepanto. He also deployed into the Atlantic and the Spanish Main, engaging and defeating English privateers. In his last years he became a Knight Hospitaller before writing his memoirs.

== Biography ==
Born to a very poor family he enrolled in the army at the young age of 15 (in his autobiography he says 14 but the date he gives, September 1597, corresponds with 15) using his mother's name, Contreras. J.B. Trend's account is that he ran away to enlist after stabbing a school-fellow in Madrid at the age of 13. He traveled to Flanders but soon deserted and traveled to Malta where, for the following six years, he would soldier in privateering ships under the banner of the Knights Hospitaller. During this time he encountered countless risks, fights and adventures. He deserted several times, mainly due to fights in which he was involved. He also learned navigation by observing the pilots do their work and was soon given command of ships. He knew the eastern Mediterranean very well and used this knowledge to write a sailing directions of the entire Mediterranean. The original manuscript of this work is kept today, together with the original manuscript of his autobiography, at the Spanish National Library in Madrid (Biblioteca Nacional de Madrid).

After six years he returned to Castile where he applied for and got a commission as an ensign and he visited his mother. His orders were to recruit his soldiers, as was customary then, and, under the command of his captain, go to Extremadura. There is an obscure incident where, in the small Morisco town of Hornachos, he found a cache of arms in a house where one of his soldiers was quartered. He was told by the local authorities to say nothing but years later he was accused and tried for plotting a rebellion. He is not very clear on this incident and it could well be that there was more to it than he intimates.

A prostitute falls in love with him after she sees him involved in a fight and joins him and follows him with his army but his captain tries to rape her and Contreras takes revenge by almost killing him. Contreras then escapes to Madrid where he gives himself up and explains what happened. He is exonerated and given order to return but most of the soldiers had deserted.

After some time of soldiering he becomes a hermit on the slopes of the Moncayo in Aragon and lives that life until he is arrested and tried for the incident of the arms at Hornachos.

He continued to have an adventurous and active military career which took him to many parts in Europe, rising to the rank of infantry captain. He also became an accomplished sailor and sailed all over the Mediterranean where he encountered many adventures. He also sailed to the West Indies where he encountered and fought the ships of Sir Walter Raleigh, which he mentions as "Guatarral" in 1618. Raleigh, the famous pirate, had recently been released from the Tower of London, where he had spent years on charges of treason, and was now heading on an illegal expedition to the Spanish territory of the Orinoco River, which he failed to reach. Contreras disguised his fleet as merchant ships and fired on the English when they approached, putting them to flight and killing the pirate's namesake son in battle.

For a time he was the governor of a small city in Italy. In Italy he married a Castilian lady but, having become suspicious of her faithfulness, he discovered her in bed in another man and killed them. He was present at the eruption of the Vesuvius volcano of 1631 and helped save some lives. He was befriended by the poet Lope de Vega who, having heard his tales, was probably who prompted him to write his autobiography.

=== Bibliography ===
His autobiography has been published many times in Spanish and the sailing directions at least once. Information on the various Spanish editions and a link to the downloadable text can be found at Wikipedia's page in Spanish. An English translation was published in 1926 and a more recent translation was published in 1989 by Paragon House, New York, titled The Adventures of Captain Alonso De Contreras: A 17th Century Journey.

In the Spanish archives of Simancas (Archivo General de Simancas) there are, archived, two of his memorials, a sort of "resume" listing their accomplishments which, at the time, soldiers would have to prepare every time they sought promotion. The second one is dated fifteen years after his autobiography and gives further insight into the story of his life.

Contreras compiled sailing charts about Mediterranean ports, capes and creeks, marking where all kinds of ships can be repaired and marking the depth of water. Either the original or a copy was later possessed by the Prince of Oneglia, the Spanish Viceroy of Sicily and is noted by J.B. Trend as being still preserved in the National Library at Madrid.
