= Morisco Quran =

Excerpts used by forced converts

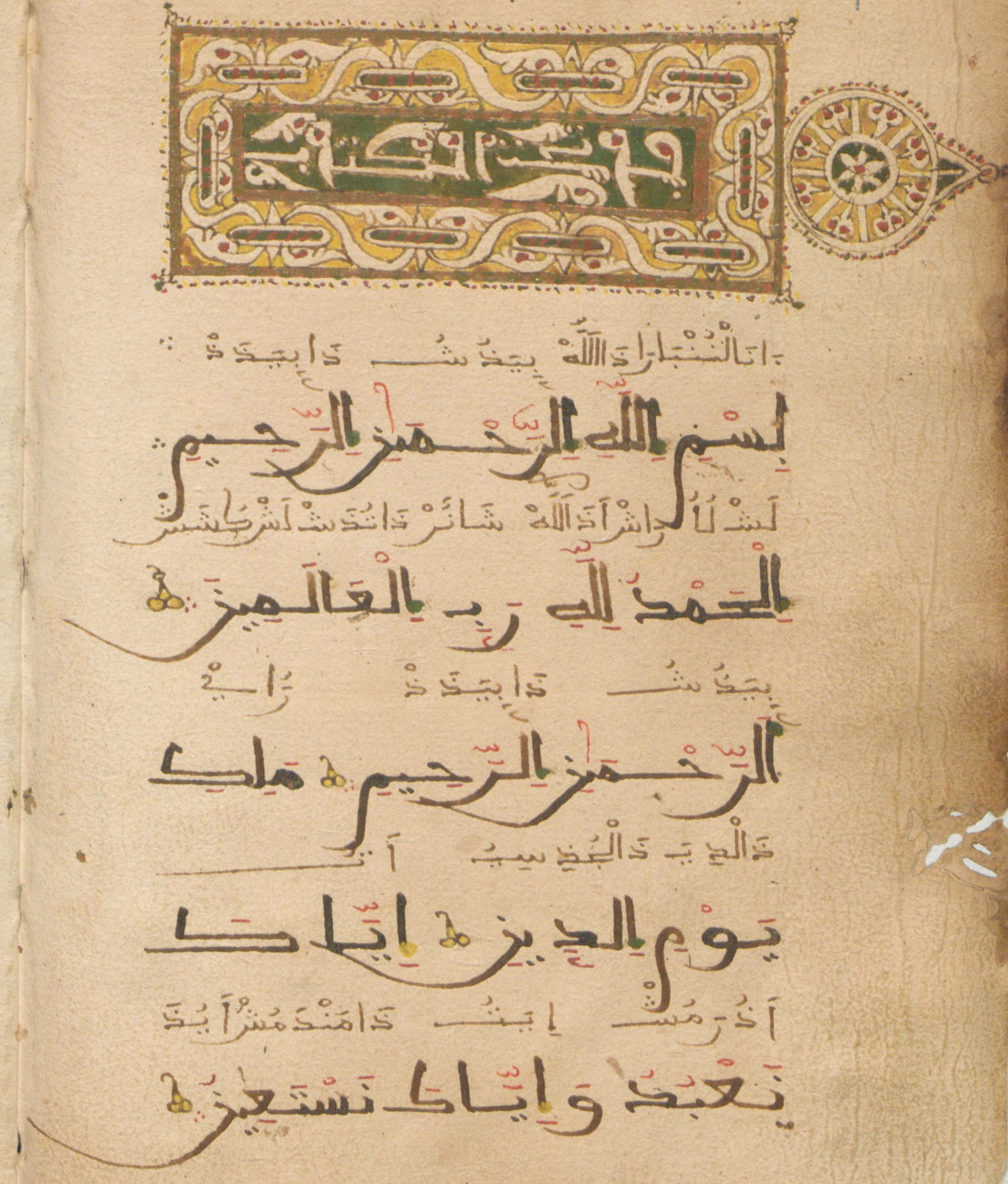
Al-Fatiha in a Morisco Quran with line-by-line translations of the Arabic into Castilian in Aljamiado script.

The Morisco Quran describes a selection of Quranic excerpts that constituted Qurans used in Morisco communities in Iberia beginning in the early 16th century, after the forced conversion of Muslims to Catholicism in 1502 in Castile, 1526 in Aragon.

The selection of surahs and verses appearing in Morisco Qurans represents about 12 percent of a full muṣḥaf.

== History ==
After the Fall of Granada, non-Christians that stayed in Iberia were subject to forced conversions and various measures of cultural Christianization. In 1564, all Arabic books were to be burned in Valencia and Moriscos in Granada were ordered to learn Spanish within three years. In 1567, it was forbidden in Castile to speak or possess books in Arabic. Ironically, in spite of these prohibitions, most extant manuscripts from these Muslim communities come from this time in the late-16th century, as the use of Arabic script became a form of resistance.

In Castile and Aragon, where spoken Arabic was first generally extinguished, Moriscos started using Aljamía (from العجمية al-ʿajamiya 'non-Arabic'), a form of Castilian with specific linguistic features written with Arabic script. Latin script was also used in rare cases, as in the Quran of Toledo. Manuscripts from this period have been found hidden in ceilings or in walls—the most important collection at Almonacid de la Sierra.

== Content ==
The excerpts of Quranic text included in the Morisco Quran were: Al-Fatiha; verses 1–5, 163, 255–257, and 284–286 of Al-Baqara; verses 1–6, 18, the first part of verse 19, and verses 26–27 of Al Imran; verses 128–129 of At-Tawbah; verses 78–89 of Ash-Shu'ara; verse 88 of Al-Qasas; verses 17–19 of Ar-Rum; 40–44 of Al-Ahzab; Ya-Sin; Al-Mulk; and surahs 78–114.

In addition to this selection of Quranic surahs and verses, there were prayers and ahadith. This selection of Quranic text appears systematically and with limited variation in surviving manuscripts from the time, with some variants including other verses but always including all of the aforementioned basis of excerpts.
