= Omar Balafrej =

Moroccan politician

- عمر بلافريج
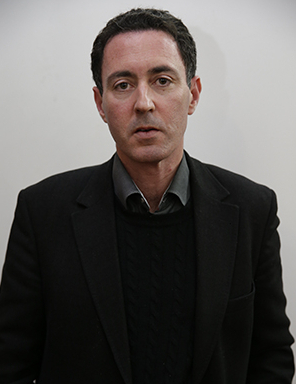

Personal details
- Born: 26 October 1973 (age 52) Rabat, Morocco
- Party: Socialist Union of Popular Forces (until 2010); Unified Socialist Party (Since 2015)

Omar Balafrej (Arabic: عمر بلافريج; born 26 October 1973) is a Moroccan politician, He served as a member of the Moroccan parliament from 2016 to 2021, representing his hometown Rabat, and was one of the two members of Unified Socialist Party at the time. Since 2014, he is also a board member of the African Innovation Foundation, providing strategic advice and technical support to strengthen the innovation landscape in Africa.

Before being elected to the parliament, Balafrej was the CEO of MITC, a Moroccan public private partnership that manages Casablanca Technopark, and the president of the Abderrahim Bouabid Foundation (ABF) from 2009 to 2012.

He announced in October 2020 that he will no longer be active in politics, choosing to focus on his entrepreneurial work and help young people in developing their projects.

== Early life ==
Omar Balafrej was born in Rabat, the capital of Morocco, in 1973. His father was a doctor, and his granduncle was Ahmed Balafrej. He has also familial relations with Mohamed El Yazghi and Abderrahim Bouabid, which made him interested in politics since his childhood.

After finalizing his high school studies at Lycée Descartes, he went to France, where he integrated the École centrale de Lyon, after two years of preparatory classes in Paris.

== Political career ==
After returning from his engineering studies in France, Balafrej joined the Socialist Union of Popular Forces in 1997, and was active in its sections for young people. However, he was disappointed by this party and left it in 2010, mentioning that "this party did not want to transform the Moroccan society anymore".

In 2009, Balafrej co-founded the movement "Clarity, Ambition, Courage" (CAC), aiming to unify the Moroccan left. Balafrej and his movement was active in different events, mainly during the 2011–2012 Moroccan protests as well as during demonstrations against Al-Boraq, the high-speed rail service commissioned by the state without a prior discussion with people or their representatives. The CAC movement was part of a loose coalition of about 50 groups known as "Stop TGV!". Their efforts included petitions, demonstrations and public debates.

In 2015, Balafrej and the CAC joined the Federation of the Democratic Left, which was a coalition created the same year to gather the leftist political parties: Unified Socialist Party, Socialist Democratic Vanguard Party and National Ittihadi Congress. Under this affiliation, Balafrej was elected to the parliament as one of the 4 representatives of the city of Rabat.
