= Hornachos =

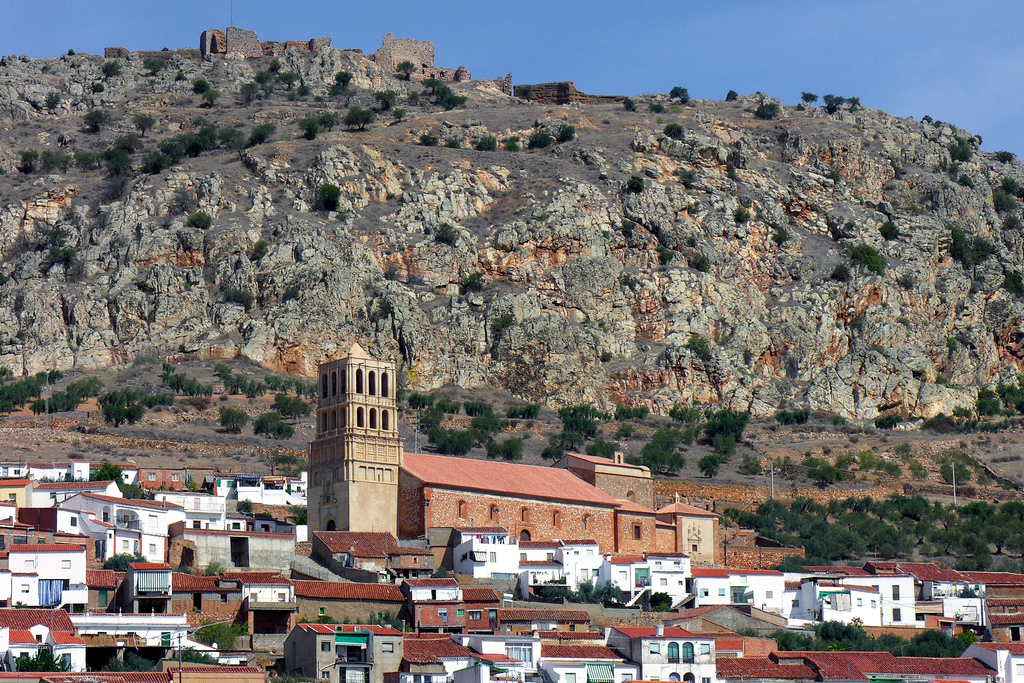

- Coat of arms

- Location of Hornachos within Extremadura
- Coordinates: 38°33′20″N 6°4′11″W
- Country: Spain
- Autonomous community: Extremadura
- Province: Badajoz
- Municipality: Hornachos

Government
  - Alcalde: Francisco Buenavista García (PSOE)

Area
  - Total: 295.9 km^{2} (114.2 sq mi)
- Elevation: 538 m (1,765 ft)

Population (2025-01-01)
  - Total: 3,375
  - Density: 11.41/km^{2} (29.54/sq mi)
- Time zone: UTC+1 (CET)
  - Summer (DST): UTC+2 (CEST)

Hornachos is a municipality located in the province of Badajoz, Extremadura, Spain. According to the 2005 census (INE), the municipality has a population of 3,840 inhabitants.

== History ==
The first human settlements in the mountain range of Hornachos are dated from prehistoric times as shown by the cave paintings in the quartzite rocks. These paintings were made between the Neolithic and the Bronze Age, around 2,000-3,000 BCE.

The city was occupied during the Roman period and it was then when it received the name of Fornacis due to the iron mines and where the name 'Hornachos' ultimately derives. Archaeological evidence (Hornachuelos Oppidum) shows that the site had certain importance in Emerita Augusta during the 2nd and 1st centuries BCE. During the Visigoths' time the tradition sets Hornachos as the refuge of Saint Hermenegild when escaping from his father, King Leovigild.

The defensive fortress crowning the village was built during the Al-Andalus period. In 1234 Hornachos was occupied by the Order of Santiago, as a land grant by Ferdinand III of Castile, However, this was not originally a cause of concern for the majority Muslim -then Morisco after 1502- population. Nevertheless, at the end of the 16th century the village was surrounded by a wall and there were more than 10,000 inhabitants, being the most important Morisco centre in Spain. The Spanish captain Alonso de Contreras narrates in his memoir how he found a stash of arms stored by some Moriscos, and years later was accused of planning a revolt with said Moriscos. On April 9, 1609, King Philip III of Spain decreed the expulsion of the Moriscos. The village underwent a period of decline.

These moriscos refugees settled in Morocco, near Bou Regreg and Salé (modern-day Rabat), and went on to create a small independent maritime republic, known as the Republic of Bou Regreg or Republic of Salé, which was a haven for corsair activity in the region.

Nowadays the village keeps the heritage from the past in its steep streets following the Moorish building schemes as it is shown in places as Ribera, San Francisco, Chamorro, Peña, Enfermería o Plata, Tellada, Larga, Gata, Nogueras, etc.

== Sites of interest ==
The most characteristic and outstanding site of Hornachos is its castle built on the top of the hill by the berbers in the 9th century and whose remains observe the daily life of the hornachegos.

Other of the most relevant monuments of Hornachos is the Church of the Purísima Concepción, a Mudejar work which stands as a unique example in the region and which has been recently declared Monument of Historical and Artistic Interest in Extremadura.

=== Purísima Concepción Church ===
The building is characterised by the use of brick as the main material and the dominant geometrical character, distinctly Islamic, emerged conspicuously in the accessory crafts using cheap materials elaborately worked—tilework, brickwork, wood carving, plaster carving, and ornamental metals. The tiling patterns stand out as the Ferdinand and Isabella coat of arms. The church tower has 24 spaces, 6 in each side.

=== Other landmarks ===
Other landmarks include the Franciscan Convent of San Ildefonso, founded in 1526 by Charles I of Spain, and which keeps a rich set of altarpieces, paintings and sculptures. On its facade, nowadays very damaged, still displays the original imperial coat of arms of Charles I.

An important site is the Church of the Remedios, built in XVI and remodeled in 1892, surrounded by a square covered by palm trees and where the festivities of September are celebrated.

Very relevant within the Hornachos' monuments are its traditional fountains as Los Moros, Los Cristianos, Palomas, Cuatro Caños, Ribera, San Francisco, Almagrera, Maxicaco, San Roque, Santa, Nueva, etc.

El Pósito, situated in the outskirts of the village, was used by the moriscos as a mosque and it has been recently restored.

== Geography: flora and fauna ==
The Hornachos mountain range constitutes the southerner mountains of the Central Sierras of Badajoz. The most important formations are the Sierra Grande and the Sierra de los Pinos with a maximum height of 951 m in the Hornachos Hill. The main rivers which flow along the area are the Palomillas river and the Matachel. The most characteristic elements of the landscape is the dehesa or meadow of holm-oaks and cork oaks. The rest has a Mediterranean vegetation, characterized by drought-resistant plants, commonly reduced to scrub status (matorral). Some common plants are also the retama sphaerocarpa, the genista hirsuta, the erica australis and the narrow-leaved cistus.

=== Dehesa ===
In the highest part of the Sierra the Juniperus oxycedrus appears with great splendor. There are more than 600 ha. inside the protected area ZEC-ZEPA. Within this grows a curious plant, the Erodium mouretii, an endemic species found only in certain parts of Extremadura, Andalusia and Northern Morocco.

=== Sierra ===
The Sierra is a setting for animal life, having a variety of birds of prey. Within the ZEC-ZEPA area more than 228 different species have been found, a high number if we take into account the limited zone (12,000 ha). The Spanish imperial eagle and other large birds such as the vulture, the eagle owl, the buzzard, the falcon, the kite are native of these mountains. During autumn and winter the Sierra also becomes the shelter for migrant birds such as the European robin or the pyrrhula.

The association ADENEX is responsible for a Natural Reserve and research centre in this location.

Finally another appealing natural spot is the reservoir of Los Molinos.

== Feast and traditions ==
Most of the festivities which take place in Hornachos have their origin in religious traditions. One of the most important is the Candelas, celebrated on 2 February. The inhabitants gather around huge bonfires, where is thought that all the evil spirits and the previous bad experiences are burnt. In February Hornachos celebrates the carnival, the merrymaking and festivity that takes place in the last days and hours before the Lenten season. Home-made and elaborate costumes, parades, parties and various other festivities mark such celebration.

The Holy Week, the week between Palm Sunday and Easter, is observed with special solemnity as a time of devotion to the passion of Jesus Christ beginning with the traditional blessing and procession of palms and olive branches. The end of celebration is on Easter Sunday when the traditional white cakes are blessed. On 15 May, San Isidro, Hornachos begins a traditional feast where all the inhabitants share a nice country day to eat and drink with their neighbours. The religious festivity of San Juan is celebrated on 24 June, where the Night of the Fire- the Night of the Water takes place. People wet their heads in the San Francisco basin, with the belief that they will not suffer headaches until the following year. In the middle of August, the Emigrant feast is held dedicated to the ones who had to abandon their village and who usually return on this date. However the most important festivity begins 8 September, Nuestra Señora de los Remedios, patroness of Hornachos, where the whole village organizes parties, shows and encierros ("enclosing") of the bulls, when they are driven through the streets behind crowds of skillfully dodging men and boys.

== See also ==
- List of municipalities in Badajoz
