= Quran of Toledo =

1606 manuscript with a Spanish translation of the Quran

- Biblioteca de Castilla-La Mancha in Toledo
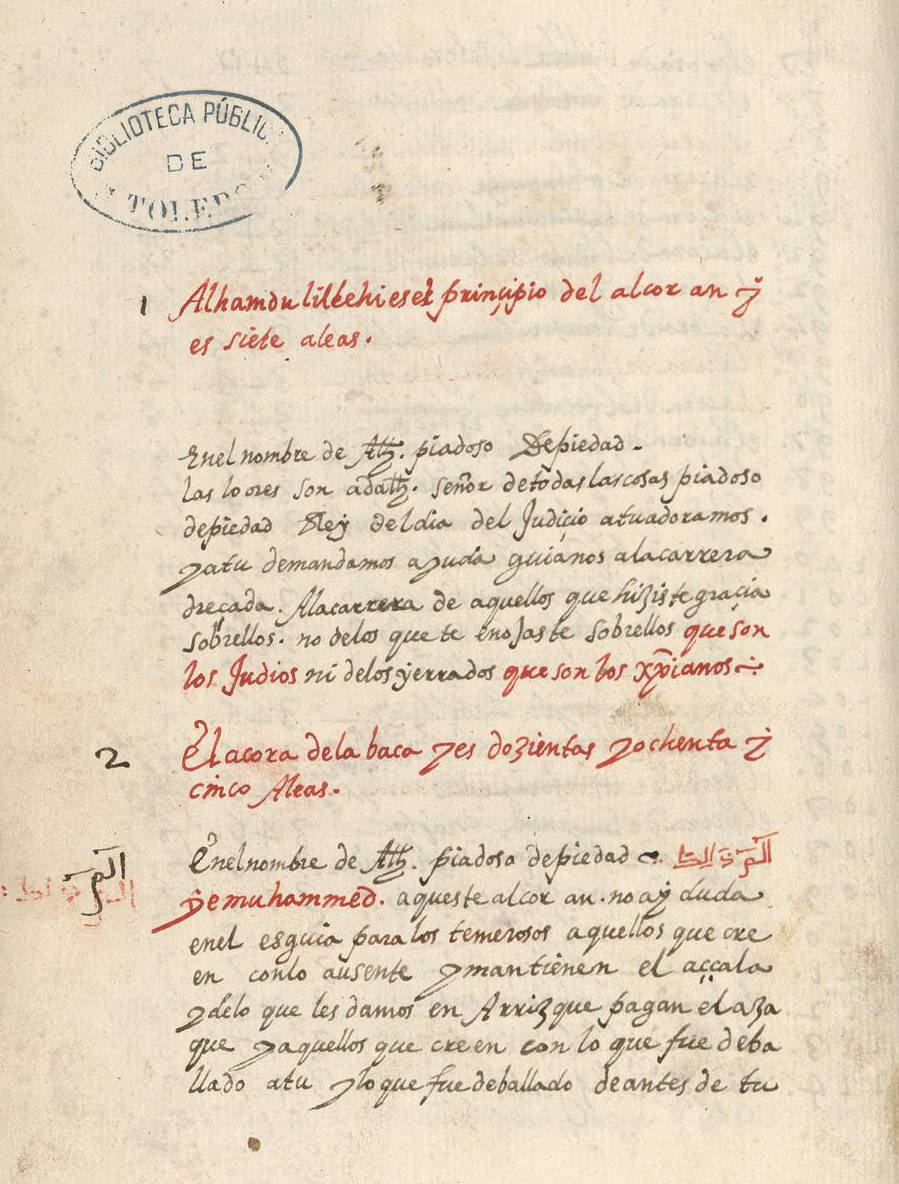
- Al-Fatiha and the beginning of Al-Baqara
- Also known as: T 235
- Language: Spanish
- Script: Latin

The Quran of Toledo is a 1606 manuscript copy of the Quran translated completely into a variety of Castilian in Latin script, probably in Villafeliche. It is held as manuscrito 235 at the Biblioteca de Castilla-La Mancha in Toledo. It is the only surviving full vernacular translation of the Quran from the period, although it includes exegetical commentaries and it is by no means a faithful word-for-word translation of the Quranic text.

== Script ==
Although Arabic and Latin scripts are used together in the colophon of the manuscript, the main text of the manuscript is written in Castilian using Latin script. The copyist writes that they are able to write with greater speed and ease in Latin script, admitting a poor knowledge of Arabic, writing: "[el escribano] sabe la letra de los cristianos y de los muçlimes y parte del arábigo," though the copyist writes that the Quranic text is copied from a bilingual codex: "lo copió de otro Alcorán que estaba en su propia lengua de arábigo y declarado palabra por palabra al vocablo." A number of bilingual codices used by Moriscos at the time survive, and Nuria de Castilla hypothesizes that the scribe of the Quran of Toledo was copying from the Aljamiado—text in Castilian written in Arabic script—from a bilingual codex containing the text in Arabic and Castilian, both written in Arabic script, thereby simply transliterating the Castilian text from Arabic script to Latin script.

== Text ==
=== Non-Quranic text ===
A full scan of the Quran of Toledo.

Exegetical commentaries are distinguished by their red ink in the first 105 folios, after which they are signaled with forward slash marks.

=== Language ===
Consuelo López-Morillas describes a peculiar "linguistic flavor" that the Quran of Toledo has in common with all Iberian vernacular Qurans, a discernible sacred "Quranic Spanish"—like the Latin of the Vulgate or the English of the Authorized Version. López-Morillas also notes the highly literary quality of the text, and the copyist's demonstrated knowledge of the Quran despite errors. She notes the presence of "Arabisms," such as the imitation of the Arabic absolute object (المفعول المطلق al-maf'ūl al-muṭlaq) construction: "¿Quién será aquel que anticipará ad Allah anticipamiento?" to render مَنْ ذَا الَّذِي يُقْرِضُ اللَّهَ قَرْضًا ^{[Quran 2:245]}, though the use of Arabisms is not excessive.

== Publications ==
Consuelo López-Morillas published an edition and study of the manuscript in 2011.
