= Morisco =

Muslim-descended community in Spain

Moriscos (Spanish: [moˈɾiskos], Catalan: [muˈɾiskus]; Portuguese: mouriscos [mo(u)ˈɾiʃkuʃ]; "Moorish") were former Spanish Muslims and their descendants who had been commanded to forcibly convert to Catholicism or face compulsory exile from the Crowns of Castile and Aragon after the Catholic Monarchs outlawed the practice of Islam in 1502, ten years after the similar expulsion of Jews from Spain. Spain had a sizeable Muslim population, called Mudéjars, at the beginning of the 16th century.

The Iberian Union mistrusted Moriscos and feared that they would support invasions from the Ottoman Empire, so between 1609 and 1614 they began to expel them systematically from the various kingdoms of the Union. The most severe expulsions occurred in the eastern Kingdom of Valencia. The exact number of Moriscos present in Spain before the expulsion is unknown and can only be guessed based on official records of the edict of expulsion. Furthermore, the overall number who were able to avoid deportation is also unknown, with estimates on the proportion of those who avoided expulsion or returned to Spain ranging from 5% to 40%.

The large majority settled on the western fringe of the Ottoman Empire and in the Kingdom of Morocco. The last mass prosecution against Moriscos for crypto-Islamic practices occurred in Granada in 1727, with most receiving relatively light sentences.

In the Spanish language and unrelated to the Moriscos of Spain (who were European Muslims), the term Morisco was used in colonial-era Spanish America to denote mixed-race castas: the children of Spanish men and women of mixed European-Mulatto ancestry.

== Name and etymology ==
The label morisco for Muslims who converted to Christianity began to appear in texts in the first half of the sixteenth century, though the use of the term at this time was limited. Usage became widespread in Christian sources during the second half of the century, but it was unclear whether Moriscos adopted the term. In their texts, it was more common for them to speak of themselves simply as muslimes (Muslims); in later periods, they may have begun to accept the label. In modern times, the label is in widespread use in Spanish literature and adopted by other languages, including Standard Arabic: الموريسكيون, romanized: al-Mūrīskiyyūn.

The word morisco appears in twelfth-century Castilian texts as an adjective for the noun moro. These two words are comparable to the English adjective "Moorish" and noun "Moor". Mediaeval Castilians used the words in the general senses of "Muslim" or an "Arabic-speaker" as in the case of Muslim converts; the words continued to be used in these older meanings even after the more specific meaning of morisco (which does not have a corresponding noun) became widespread.

According to L. P. Harvey, the two different meanings have resulted in modern scholars misinterpreting historical texts. In the early years, the Christians called them "new Christians," "new converts", or "new Christians, converted from Moors" (nuevos christianos convertidos de moros; to distinguish from those converted from Judaism) to refer to this group.

In 1517, the word morisco became a "category" added to the array of cultural and religious identities that existed at the time, used to identify Muslim converts to Christianity in Granada and Castille. The term was a pejorative adaptation of the adjective morisco ("Moorish"). It soon became the standard term for referring to all former Spain Muslims.

In Spanish America, morisco (or morisca, in feminine form) was used to identify a racial category: a mixed-race casta, the child of a Spaniard (español) and a mulatto (offspring of a Spaniard and a negro, generally a lighter-complexioned person with some African ancestry). This was likely due to a perception that such individuals resembled North Africans and West Asians, appearing mostly “white.” The term appears in colonial-era marriage registers identifying individuals, and in eighteenth-century casta paintings.

== Demographics ==
There is no universally agreed figure for the Morisco population. Estimates vary because of the lack of a precise census. In addition, the Moriscos avoided registration and the authorities and tried to appear as members of the majority Spanish population. Furthermore, populations would have fluctuated, due to such factors as birth rates, conquests, conversions, relocations, and emigration.

Historians generally agree that, based on expulsion records, around 275,000 Moriscos were expelled from Spain in the early 17th century. Historian L. P. Harvey in 2005 gave a range of 300,000 to 330,000 for the early 16th century; based on earlier estimates by Domínguez Ortiz and Bernard Vincent, who gave 321,000 for the period 1568–75, and 319,000 just before the expulsion of 1609. Christiane Stallaert put the number at around one million Moriscos at the beginning of the 16th century. Recent studies by Trevor Dadson on the expulsion of the Moriscos propose the figure of 500,000 just before the expulsion, consistent with figures given by other historians. Dadson concludes that, assuming the 275,000 figure from the official expulsion records is correct, around 40% of Spain's Moriscos managed to avoid expulsions altogether. According to Dadson, a further 20% managed to return to Spain in the years following their expulsion..

=== Kingdom of Granada ===
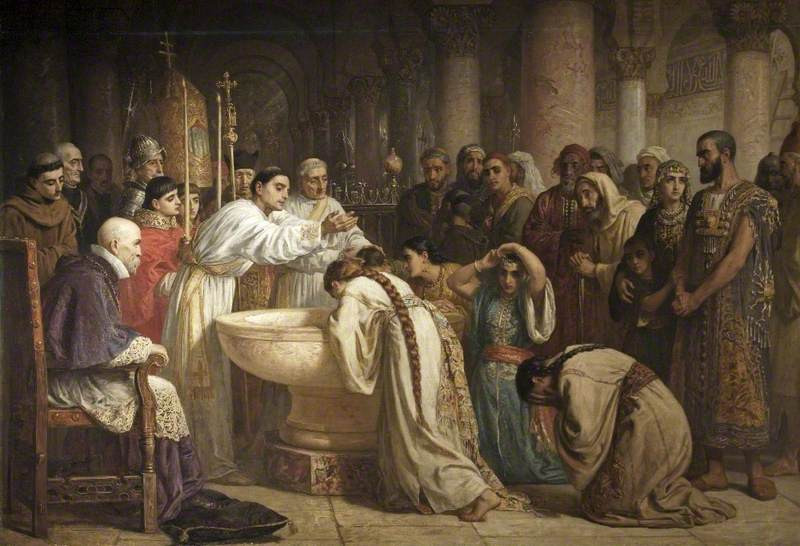
The Moorish Proselytes of Archbishop Ximenes, Granada, 1500 by Edwin Long, 1873

The Emirate of Granada was the last Muslim kingdom in the Iberian Peninsula, which surrendered in 1492 to the Catholic forces after a decade-long campaign. Granada was annexed to Castile as the Kingdom of Granada, and had a majority Muslim population of between 250,000 and 300,000. Initially, the Treaty of Granada guaranteed their rights to be Muslim but Cardinal Cisneros's effort to convert the population led to a series of rebellions. The rebellions were suppressed, and afterwards the Muslims in Granada were given the choice to remain and accept baptism, reject baptism and be enslaved or killed, or to go into exile. The option of exile was often not feasible in practice, and hindered by the authorities. Shortly after the rebellions' defeat, the entire Muslim population of Granada had nominally become Christian.

Although they converted to Christianity, they maintained their existing customs, including their language, distinct names, food, dress and even some ceremonies. Many secretly practiced Islam, even as they publicly professed and practiced Christianity. This led the Catholic rulers to adopt increasingly intolerant and harsh policies to eradicate these practices. This culminated in Philip II's Pragmatica of 1 January 1567, which ordered the Moriscos to abandon their customs, clothing and language. The Pragmatica triggered the Morisco revolts in 1568–71. The Spanish authorities quashed this rebellion, and at the end of the fighting, the authorities decided to expel the Moriscos from Granada and scatter them to the other parts of Castile. Between 80,000 and 90,000 Granadans were marched to cities and towns across Castile.

=== Kingdom of Valencia ===
In 1492, the Kingdom of Valencia, part of the Crown of Aragon, had the second largest Muslim population in Spain after Granada, which became nominally the largest after the forced conversions in Granada in 1502. The nobles of Valencia continued to allow Islam to be practiced until the 1520s, and, to some extent, the Islamic legal system to be preserved.

In the 1520s, the Revolt of the Brotherhoods broke out among the Christian subjects of Valencia. The rebellion bore an anti-Islamic sentiment, and the rebels forced Valencian Muslims to become Christians in the territories they controlled. The Muslims joined the Crown in suppressing the rebellion, playing crucial roles in several battles. After the rebellion was suppressed, King Charles V started an investigation to determine the validity of the conversions forced by the rebels. He ultimately upheld those conversions, therefore putting the force-converted subjects under the authority of the Inquisition, and issued declarations to the effect of forcing the conversion of the rest of the Muslims.

After the forced conversions, Valencia was the region where the remains of Islamic culture was the strongest. A Venetian ambassador in the 1570s said that some Valencian nobles "had permitted their Moriscos to live almost openly as Mohammedans." Despite efforts to ban Arabic, it continued to be spoken until the expulsions. Valencians also trained other Aragonese Moriscos in Arabic and religious texts.

=== Aragon and Catalonia ===
Moriscos accounted for 20% of the population of the kingdom of Aragon, residing principally on the banks of the Ebro river and its tributaries. Unlike Granadan and Valencian Moriscos, they did not speak Arabic but, as vassals of the nobility, were granted the privilege to practice their faith relatively openly.

Places like Muel, Zaragoza, were inhabited fully by Moriscos, the only Old Christians were the priest, the notary and the owner of the tavern-inn. "The rest would rather go on a pilgrimage to Mecca than Santiago de Compostela."

In Catalonia, Moriscos represented less than 2% of the population and were concentrated in the Low Ebro region, as well as in the city of Lleida and the towns of Aitona and Seròs, in the Low Segre region. They largely no longer spoke Arabic, instead adopting Catalan, and to a lesser extent also Castilian-Aragonese in Lleida.

=== Castile, Extremadura and the rest of Andalusia ===
The Crown of Castile included, besides the Kingdom of Granada, also Extremadura and the rest of modern-day Andalusia (the Kingdoms of Seville, Córdoba and Jaén). The Morisco population in most of this territory was more dispersed except in specific locations such as Villarrubia de los Ojos, Hornachos, Arévalo or the Señorío de las Cinco Villas in the southwestern part of the province of Albacete, where they were the majority or even the totality of the population. Castile's Moriscos were highly integrated and practically indistinguishable from the Catholic population: they did not speak Arabic and a large number of them were genuine Christians. The mass arrival of the much more visible Morisco population deported from Granada to the lands under the Crown of Castile led to a radical change in the situation of Castilian Moriscos, despite their efforts to distinguish themselves from the Granadans. For example, marriages between Castilian Moriscos and "old" Christians were much more common than between Castilian and Granadan Moriscos. The town of Hornachos was an exception, not only because practically all of its inhabitants were Moriscos but because of their open practice of the Islamic faith and of their famed independent and indomitable nature. For this reason, the order of expulsion in Castile specifically targeted the Hornacheros, the first Castilian Moriscos to be expelled. They were exceptionally allowed to leave fully armed and were marched as an undefeated army to Seville and transported to Morocco. They maintained their combative nature overseas, founding the Corsary Republic of Bou Regreg and Salé in Morocco.

=== Canary Islands ===
The situation of the Moriscos in the Canary Islands was different from on continental Europe. They were not the descendants of Iberian Muslims but were Muslim Moors taken from Northern Africa in Christian raids (cabalgadas) or prisoners taken during the attacks of the Barbary pirates against the islands. In the Canary Islands, they were held as slaves or freed, gradually converting to Christianity, with some serving as guides in raids against their former homelands. When the king forbade further raids, the Moriscos lost contact with Islam and became a substantial part of the population of the islands, reaching one-half of the inhabitants of Lanzarote. Protesting their Christianity, they managed to avoid the expulsion that affected European Moriscos. Still subjected to the ethnic discrimination of the pureza de sangre, they could not migrate to the Americas or join many organizations. Later petitions allowed for their emancipation with the rest of the Canarian population.

== Religion ==
=== Christianity ===
While the Moors chose to leave Spain and emigrate to North Africa, the Moriscos accepted Christianity and gained certain cultural and legal privileges for doing so.

Many Moriscos became devout in their new Christian faith, and in Granada, many Moriscos became Christian martyrs, as they were killed by Muslims for refusing to renounce Christianity. In 16th century Granada, the Christian Moriscos chose the Virgin Mary as their patroness saint and developed Christian devotional literature with a Marian emphasis.

=== Islam ===
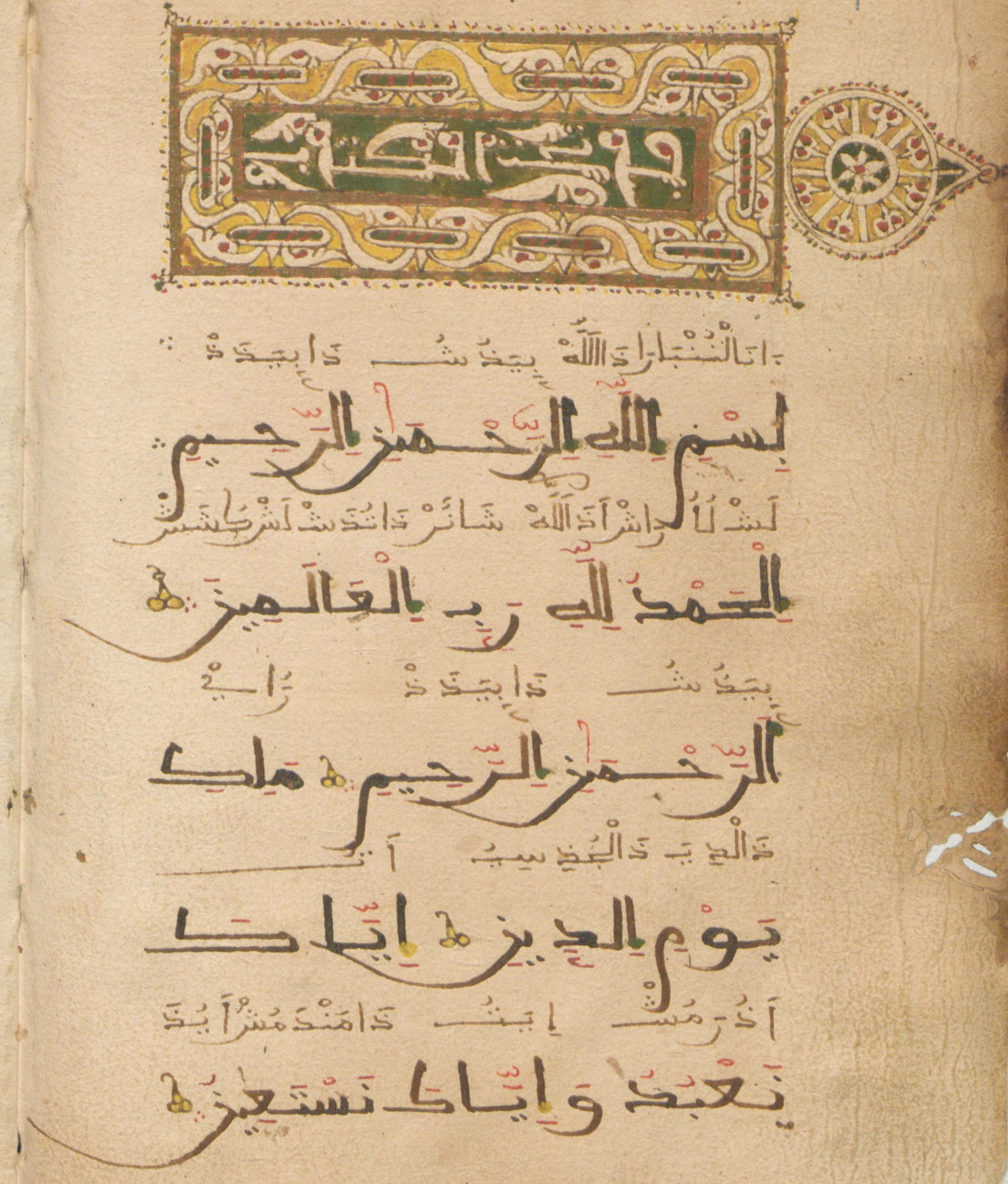
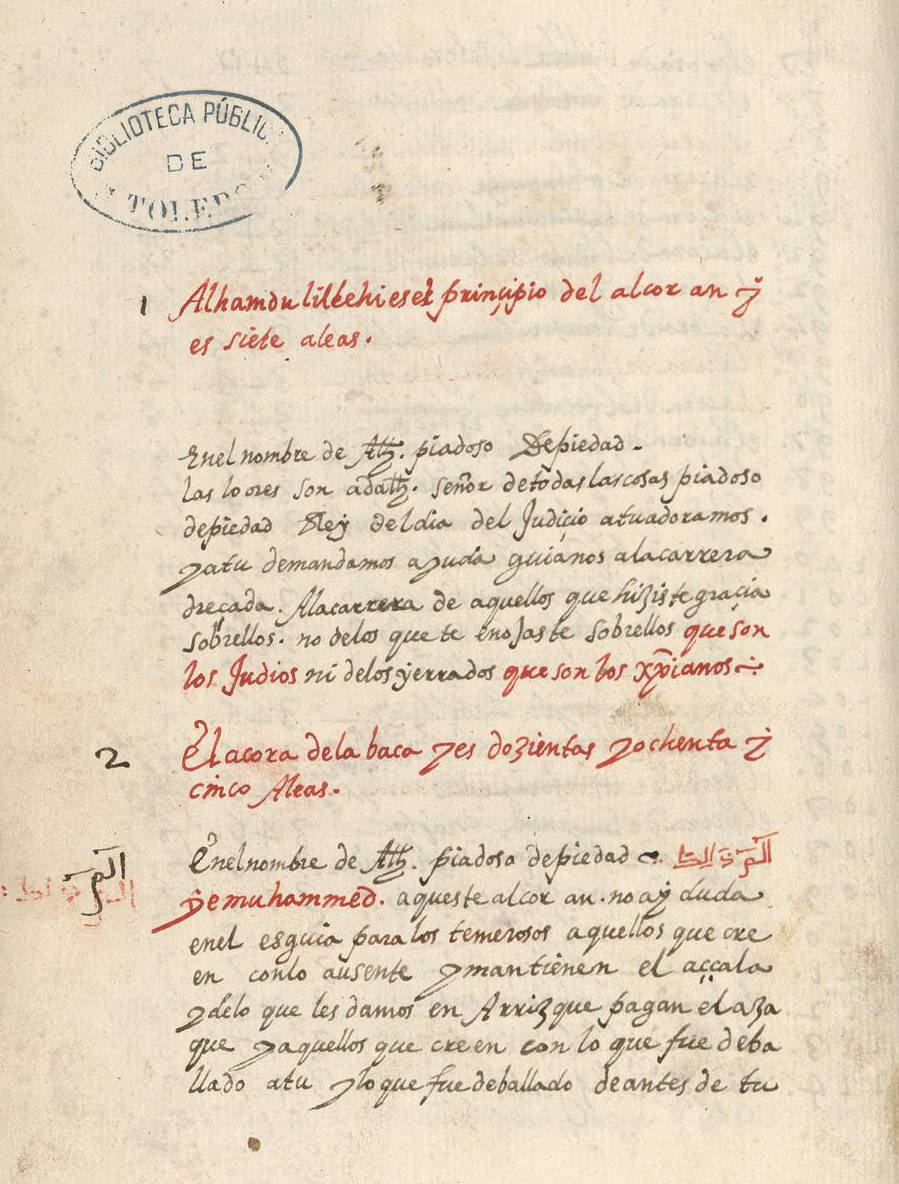
A Morisco Quran with the Arabic text and line-by-line Castilian translations in Aljamiado and the 1606 Quran of Toledo in Castilian written with Latin script.

Because conversions to Christianity were decreed by law rather than by their own will, some Moriscos still genuinely believed in Islam. Because of the danger associated with practicing Islam, however, the religion was largely practiced clandestinely. A legal opinion, called "the Oran fatwa" by modern scholars, circulated in Spain and provided religious justification for outwardly conforming to Christianity while maintaining an internal conviction of faith in Islam, when necessary for survival. The fatwa affirmed the regular obligations of a Muslim, including salah (ritual prayer) and zakat (almsgiving). However, the obligation might be fulfilled in a relaxed manner (e.g., the fatwa mentioned making the ritual prayer "even though by making some slight movement" and the ritual alms by "showing generosity to a beggar"). The fatwa also allowed Muslims to perform acts normally forbidden in Islamic law, such as consuming pork and wine, calling Jesus the son of God, and blaspheming against Muhammad as long as they maintained conviction against such acts.

The writing of a Morisco crypto-Muslim author known as the "Young Man of Arévalo" included accounts of his travel around Spain, his meetings with other clandestine Muslims and descriptions of their religious practices and discussions. The writing referred to the practice of secret congregational prayer, collecting alms to perform the Hajj (although it is unclear whether the journey was ultimately achieved), and the determination and hope to reinstitute the full practice of Islam as soon as possible. The Young Man wrote at least three extant works, Brief compendium of our sacred law and sunnah, the Tafsira and Sumario de la relación y ejercio espiritual, all written in Spanish with Arabic script (aljamiado), and primarily about religious topics.

Extant copies of the Qur'an have also been found from the Morisco period, although many are not complete copies but selections of surat, which were easier to hide. Other surviving Islamic religious materials from this period include collections of hadiths, stories of the prophets, Islamic legal texts, theological works (including al-Ghazali's works), as well as polemical literature defending Islam and criticizing Christianity.

The Moriscos also likely wrote the Lead Books of Sacromonte, texts written in Arabic claiming to be Christian sacred books from the first century AD. Upon their discovery in the mid-1590s, the books were initially greeted enthusiastically by the Christians of Granada and treated by the Christian authorities as genuine, causing a sensation throughout Europe due to their (ostensibly) ancient origin. Hispano-Arabic historian Leonard Patrick Harvey proposed that the Moriscos wrote these texts in order to infiltrate Christianity from within, by emphasizing aspects of Christianity which were acceptable to Muslims. The content of the text was superficially Christian and did not refer to Islam at all, but contained many "Islamizing" features. The text never featured the Trinity doctrine or referred to Jesus as Son of God, concepts which are blasphemous and offensive in Islam. Instead, it repeatedly stated "There is no god but God and Jesus is the Spirit of God (ruh Allah)", which is unambiguously close to the Islamic shahada and referred to the Qur'anic epithet for Jesus, "the Spirit from him [God]". It contained passages which appeared (unbeknownst to the Christians at the time) to implicitly predict the arrival of Muhammad by mentioning his various Islamic epithets.

In many ways, their situation was comparable to that of the Marranos, secret Jews who lived in Spain at the same time.

== Timeline ==
=== Conquest of al-Andalus ===
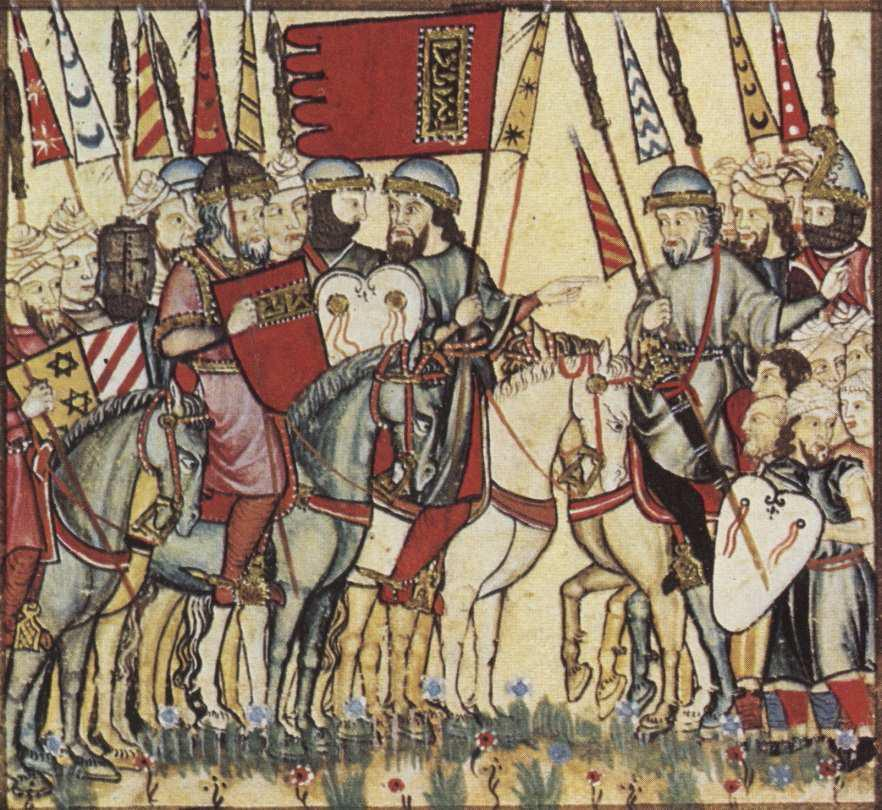
Muhammad I of Granada leading his troops during the Mudéjar revolt of 1264–66, illustrated in the contemporary Cantigas de Santa Maria

Islam had been present in Spain since the Umayyad conquest of Hispania in the eighth century. At the beginning of the twelfth century, the Muslim population in the Iberian Peninsula – called "Al-Andalus" by the Muslims – was estimated to number as high as 5.5 million, among whom were Arabs, Berbers and indigenous converts. In the next few centuries, as the Christians pushed from the north in a process called Reconquista, the Muslim population declined. At the end of the fifteenth century, the Reconquista culminated in the fall of Granada and the total number of Muslims in Spain was estimated at between 500,000 and 600,000 out of the total Spanish population of 7 to 8 million. Approximately half of the remaining Muslims lived in the former Emirate of Granada, the last independent Muslim state in Spain, which was annexed by the Crown of Castile. About 20,000 Muslims lived in other territories of Castile, and most of the remainder lived in the territories of the Crown of Aragon. Prior to this in Castile 200,000 of the 500,000 Muslims had been forcibly converted; 200,000 had left and 100,000 had died or been enslaved.

The Christians called the defeated Muslims who came under their rule the Mudéjars. Prior to the completion of the Reconquista, they were generally given freedom of religion as terms of their surrender. For example, the Treaty of Granada, which governed the surrender of the emirate, guaranteed a set of rights to the conquered Muslims, including religious tolerance and fair treatment, in return for their capitulation.

=== Forced conversions of Muslims ===
When efforts by Granada's first archbishop, Hernando de Talavera for conversion to Christianity, were less than successful, Cardinal Jimenez de Cisneros took stronger measures: forced conversions, burning Islamic texts, and prosecution of many of Granada's Muslims. In response to these and other violations of the Treaty, Granada's Muslim population rebelled in 1499. The revolt lasted until early 1501, giving the Castilian authorities an excuse to void the terms of the Treaty for Muslims. In 1501 the terms of the Treaty of Granada protections were abandoned.

In 1501 Castilian authorities delivered an ultimatum to Granada's Muslims: either convert to Christianity or be expelled. Most did convert, in order not to have their property and small children taken away from them. Many continued to dress in their traditional fashion, speak Arabic, and secretly practiced Islam (crypto-Muslims). The 1504 Oran fatwa provided scholarly religious dispensations and instructions about secretly practicing Islam while outwardly practicing Christianity. With the decline of Arabic culture, many used the aljamiado writing system, i.e., Castilian or Aragonese texts in Arabic writing with scattered Arabic expressions. In 1502, Queen Isabella I of Castile formally rescinded tolerance of Islam for the entire Crown of Castile. In 1508, Castilian authorities banned traditional Granadan clothing. With the 1512 Spanish invasion of Navarre, the Muslims of Navarre were ordered to convert or leave by 1515.

However, King Ferdinand, as ruler of the Crown of Aragon, continued to tolerate the large Muslim population living in his territory. Since the Crown of Aragon was juridically independent of Castile, their policies towards Muslims could and did differ during this period. Historians have suggested that the Crown of Aragon was inclined to tolerate Islam in its realm because the landed nobility there depended on the cheap, plentiful labor of Muslim vassals. However, the landed elite's exploitation of Aragon's Muslims also exacerbated class resentments. In the 1520s, when Valencian guilds rebelled against the local nobility in the Revolt of the Brotherhoods, the rebels "saw that the simplest way to destroy the power of the nobles in the countryside would be to free their vassals, and this they did by baptizing them." The Inquisition and monarchy decided to prohibit the forcibly baptized Muslims of Valencia from returning to Islam. Finally, in 1526, King Charles V issued a decree compelling all Muslims in the crown of Aragon to convert to Catholicism or leave the Iberian Peninsula (Portugal had already expelled or forcibly converted its Muslims in 1497 and established its own Inquisition in 1536).

=== After the conversion ===
In Granada for the first decades after the conversion, the former Muslim elites of the former Emirate became the middlemen between the crown and the Morisco population. A certain religious tolerance, too, was still observable during the first half of the 16th century. They became alguaciles, hidalgos, courtiers, advisors to the royal court and translators of Arabic. They helped collect taxes; taxes from Granada made up one-fifth of Castile's income, and became the advocates and defenders of Moriscos within royal circles. Some of them became genuine Christians while others secretly continued to be Muslims. The Islamic faith and tradition were more persistent among the Granadan lower class, both in the city and in the countryside. The city of Granada was divided into Morisco and Old Christian quarters, and the countryside often had alternating zones dominated by Old or New Christians. Royal and Church authorities tended to ignore the secret but persistent Islamic practices and traditions among some of the Morisco population.

Outside Granada, the role of advocates and defenders were taken by the Morisco's Christian lords. In areas with high Morisco concentration, such as the Kingdom of Valencia and certain areas of other kingdoms, former Muslims played an important role in the economy, especially in agriculture and crafts. Consequently, the Christian lords often defended their Moriscos, sometimes to the point of being targeted by the Inquisition. For example, the Inquisition sentenced Sancho de Cardona, Admiral of Aragon, to life imprisonment after he was accused of allowing the Moriscos to openly practice Islam, build a mosque and openly made the adhan (call to prayer). The Duke of Segorbe (later Viceroy of Valencia) allowed his vassal in the Vall d'Uixó to operate a madrassa. A witness recalled one of his vassals saying that "we live as Moors and no one dares to say anything to us". A Venetian ambassador in the 1570s said that some Valencian nobles "had permitted their Moriscos to live almost openly as Mohammedans."

In 1567, Philip II directed Moriscos to give up their Arabic names and traditional dress, and prohibited the use of the Arabic language. In addition, the children of Moriscos were to be educated by Catholic priests. In reaction, there was a Morisco uprising in the Alpujarras from 1568 to 1571.

=== Expulsion ===
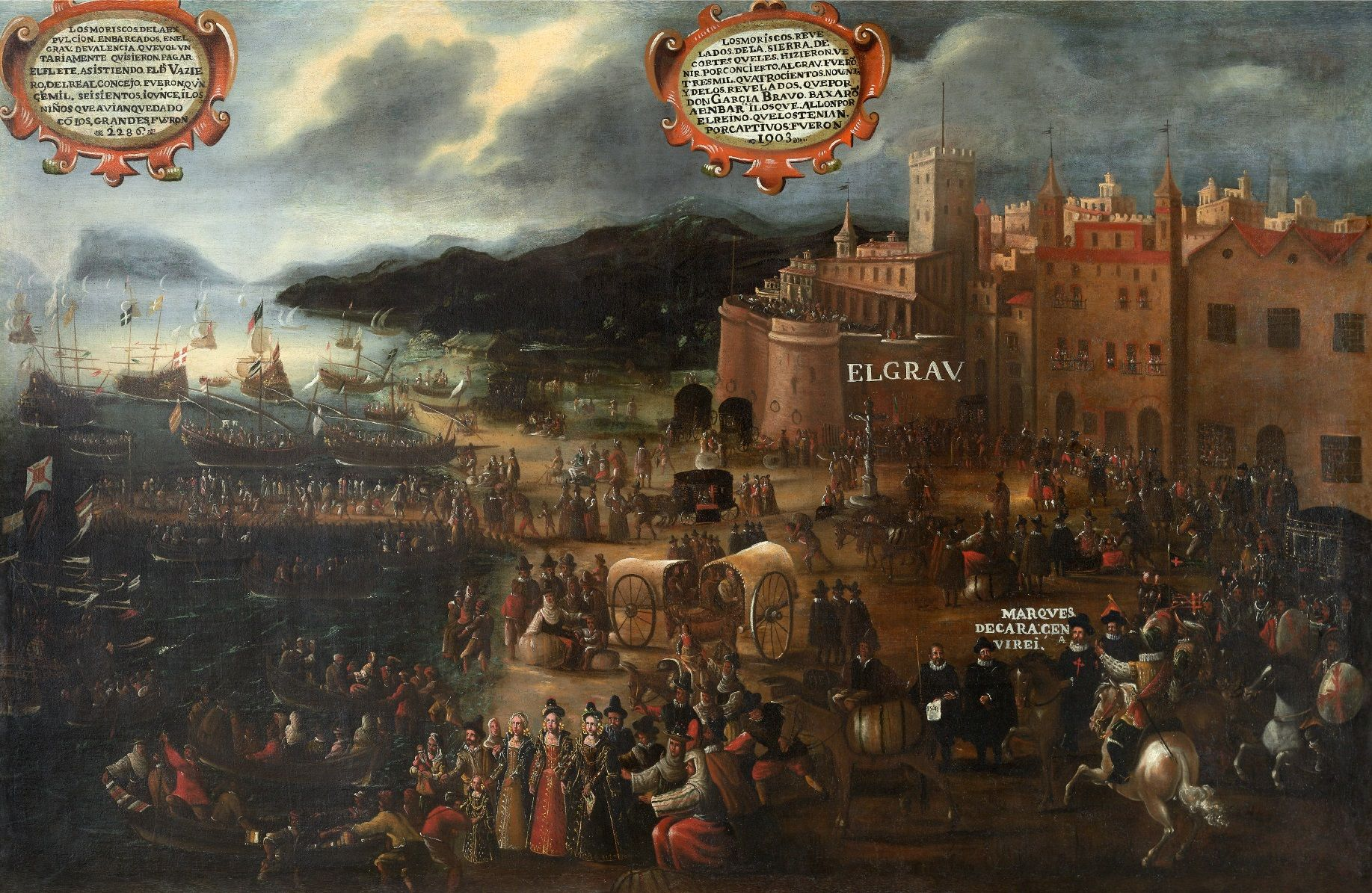
Embarkation of Moriscos in Valencia by Pere Oromig

At the instigation of the Duke of Lerma and the Viceroy of Valencia, Archbishop Juan de Ribera, Philip III expelled the Moriscos from Spain between 1609 (Aragon) and 1614 (Castile). They were ordered to depart "under the pain of death and confiscation, without trial or sentence... to take with them no money, bullion, jewels or bills of exchange... just what they could carry." Estimates for the number expelled have varied, although contemporary accounts set the number at between 270,000 and 300,000 (about 4% of the Spanish population).

The majority were expelled from the Crown of Aragon (modern day Aragon, Catalonia and Valencia), particularly from Valencia, where Morisco communities remained large, visible and cohesive; and Christian animosity was acute, particularly for economic reasons. Some historians have blamed the subsequent economic collapse of the Spanish Eastern Mediterranean coast on the region's inability to replace Morisco workers successfully with Christian newcomers. Many villages were totally abandoned as a result. New laborers were fewer in number and were not as familiar with local agricultural techniques.

In the Crown of Castile (including Andalusia, Murcia and the former Kingdom of Granada), by contrast, the scale of Morisco expulsion was much less severe. This was due to the fact that their presence was less felt as they were considerably more integrated in their communities, enjoying the support and sympathy from local Christian populations, authorities and, in some occasions, the clergy. Furthermore, the internal dispersion of the more distinct Morisco communities of Granada throughout Castile and Andalusia after the War of the Alpujarras, made this community of Moriscos harder to track and identify, allowing them to merge with and disappear into the wider society.

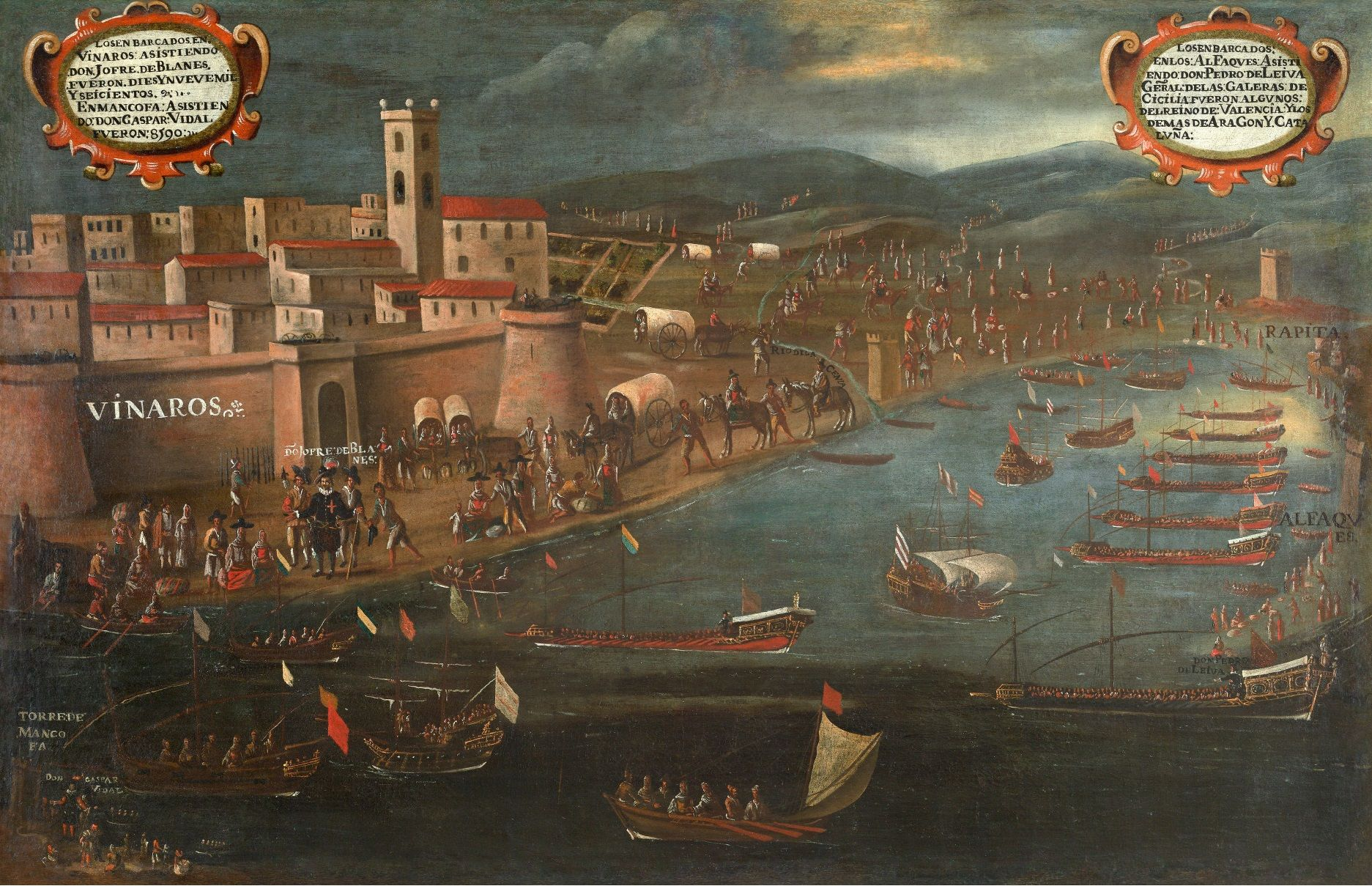
Expulsion of the Moriscos from Vinaros

Although many Moriscos were sincere Christians, adult Moriscos were often assumed to be covert Muslims (i.e. crypto-Muslims), but expelling their children presented the government with a dilemma. As the children had all been baptized, the government could not legally or morally transport them to Muslim lands. Some authorities proposed that children should be forcibly separated from their parents, but sheer numbers showed this to be impractical. Consequently, the official destination of the expellees was generally stated to be France (more specifically Marseille). After the assassination of Henry IV in 1610, about 150,000 Moriscos were sent there. Many of the Moriscos migrated from Marseille to other lands in Christendom, including Italy and Sicily, or Constantinople. Estimates of returnee numbers vary, with historian Earl Hamilton believing that as many as a quarter of those expelled may have returned to Spain.

A number of the refugees settled in the Mediterranean Maghreb and throughout the Levant, mostly in the Ottoman Empire, in Algeria, Tunisia or Morocco; some fled to Galata in the Ottoman Empire – from 1609 to the 1620s, where many Moriscos settled.

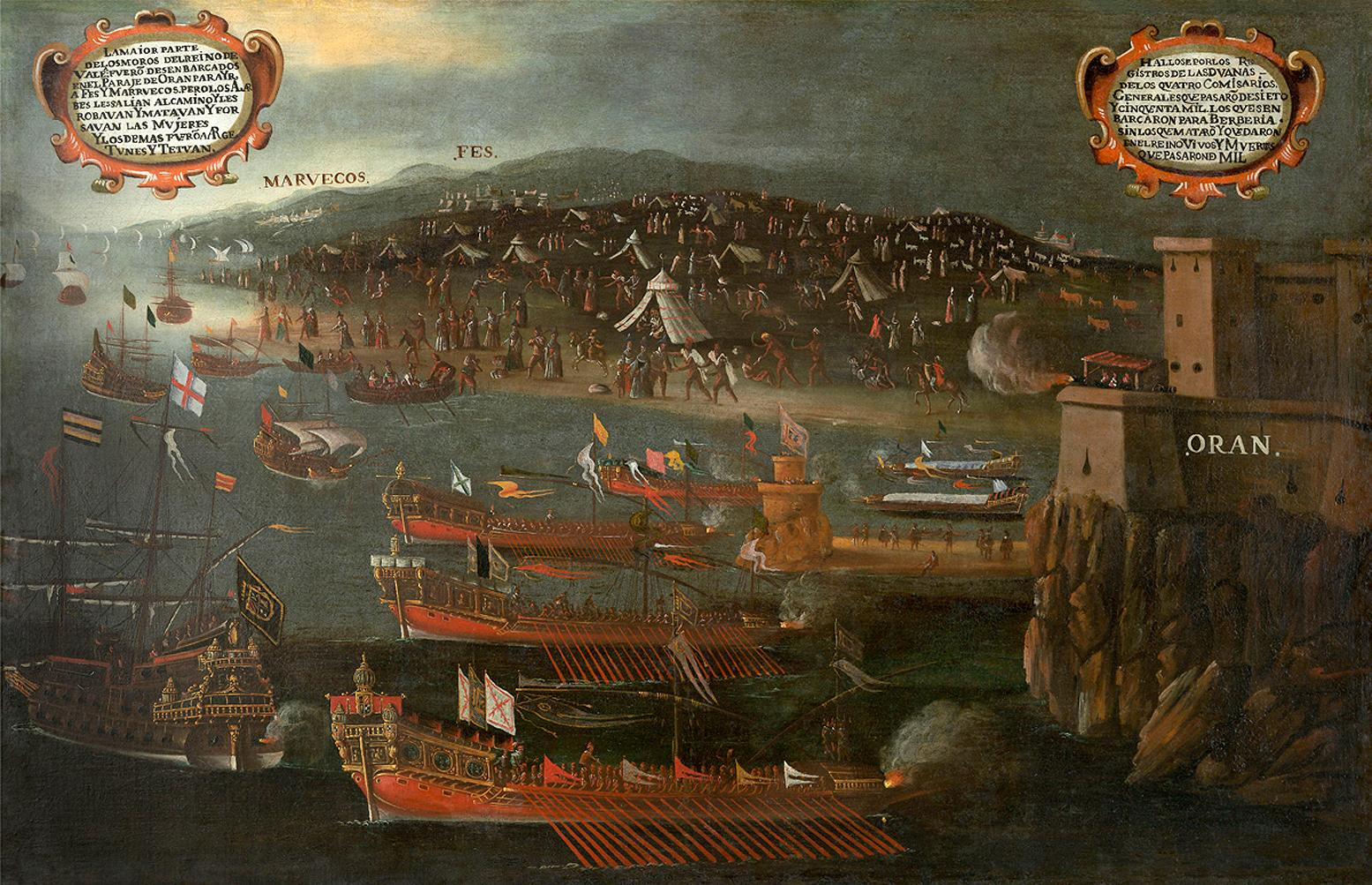
Disembarking of the Moriscos at Oran port (1613, Vicente Mostre), Fundación Bancaja de Valencia

== International relations ==
French Huguenots were in contact with the Moriscos in plans against the House of Habsburg which ruled Spain in the 1570s. Around 1575, plans were made for a combined attack of Aragonese Moriscos and Huguenots from Béarn under Henri de Navarre against Spanish Aragon, in agreement with the king of Algiers and the Ottoman Empire, but these projects floundered with the arrival of John of Austria in Aragon and the disarmament of the Moriscos. In 1576, the Ottomans planned to send a three-pronged fleet from Constantinople, to disembark between Murcia and Valencia; the French Huguenots would invade from the north and the Moriscos accomplish their uprising, but the Ottoman fleet failed to arrive.

During the reign of Sultan Mohammed ash-Sheikh (1554–1557), the Turkish danger was felt on the eastern borders of Morocco and the sovereign, even though a hero of the holy war against Christians, showed a great political realism by becoming an ally of the King of Spain, still the champion of Christianity. Everything changed from 1609, when King Philip III of Spain decided to expel the Moriscos who, numbering about three hundred thousand, were converted Muslims who had remained Christian. Rebels, always ready to rise, they vigorously refused to convert and formed a state within a state. The danger was that with the Turkish pressing from the east, the Spanish authorities, who saw in them [the Moriscos] a "potential danger", decided to expel them, mainly to Morocco....

— Bernard Lugan, Histoire du Maroc: Le Maroc et L'Occident du XVIe au XXe Siecle [History of Morocco:Morocco and the West from the 16th to the 20th Centuries), Cliothèque (Philippe Conrad ed.)

Spanish spies reported that the Ottoman Emperor Selim II was planning to attack Malta, and from there advance to Spain. It was reported Selim wanted to incite an uprising among Spanish Moriscos. In addition, "some four thousand Turks and Berbers had come into Spain to fight alongside the insurgents in the Alpujarras", a region near Granada and an obvious military threat. "The excesses committed on both sides were without equal in the experience of contemporaries; it was the most savage war to be fought in Europe that century." After the Castilian forces defeated the Islamic insurgents, they expelled some eighty thousand Moriscos from the Granada Province. Most settled elsewhere in Castile. The 'Alpujarras Uprising' hardened the attitude of the monarchy. As a consequence, the Spanish Inquisition increased prosecution and persecution of Moriscos after the uprising.

== Literature ==
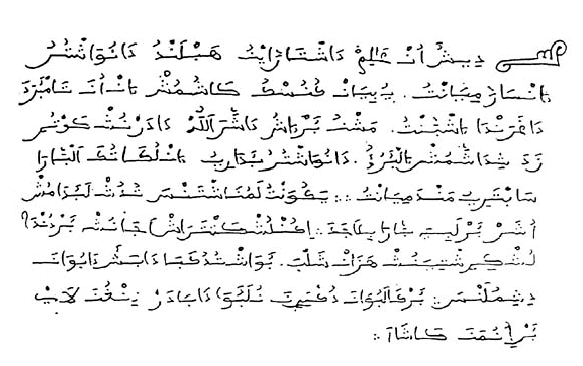
Aljamiado text by Mancebo de Arévalo. c. 16th century. The passage invites Spanish Moriscos or crypto-Muslims to continue fulfilling Islamic prescriptions and disguise (taqiyya), so they would be protected while showing public adherence to the Christian faith.

Miguel de Cervantes' writings, such as Don Quixote and Conversation of the Two Dogs, offer ambivalent views of Moriscos. In the first part of Don Quixote (before the expulsion), a Morisco translates a found-document containing the Arabic "history" that Cervantes is merely "publishing.” In the second part, after the expulsion, Ricote is a Morisco and a former neighbor of Sancho Panza. He cares more about money than religion, and left for Germany, from where he returned as a false pilgrim to unbury his treasure. He admits, however, the righteousness of their expulsion. His daughter Ana Félix is brought to Berbery, but suffers since she is a sincere Christian.

Toward the end of the 16th century, Morisco writers challenged the perception that their culture was alien to Spain. Their literary works expressed early Spanish history in which Arabic-speaking Spaniards played a positive role. Chief among such works is Verdadera historia del rey don Rodrigo by Miguel de Luna (c. 1545–1615).

== Aftermath ==
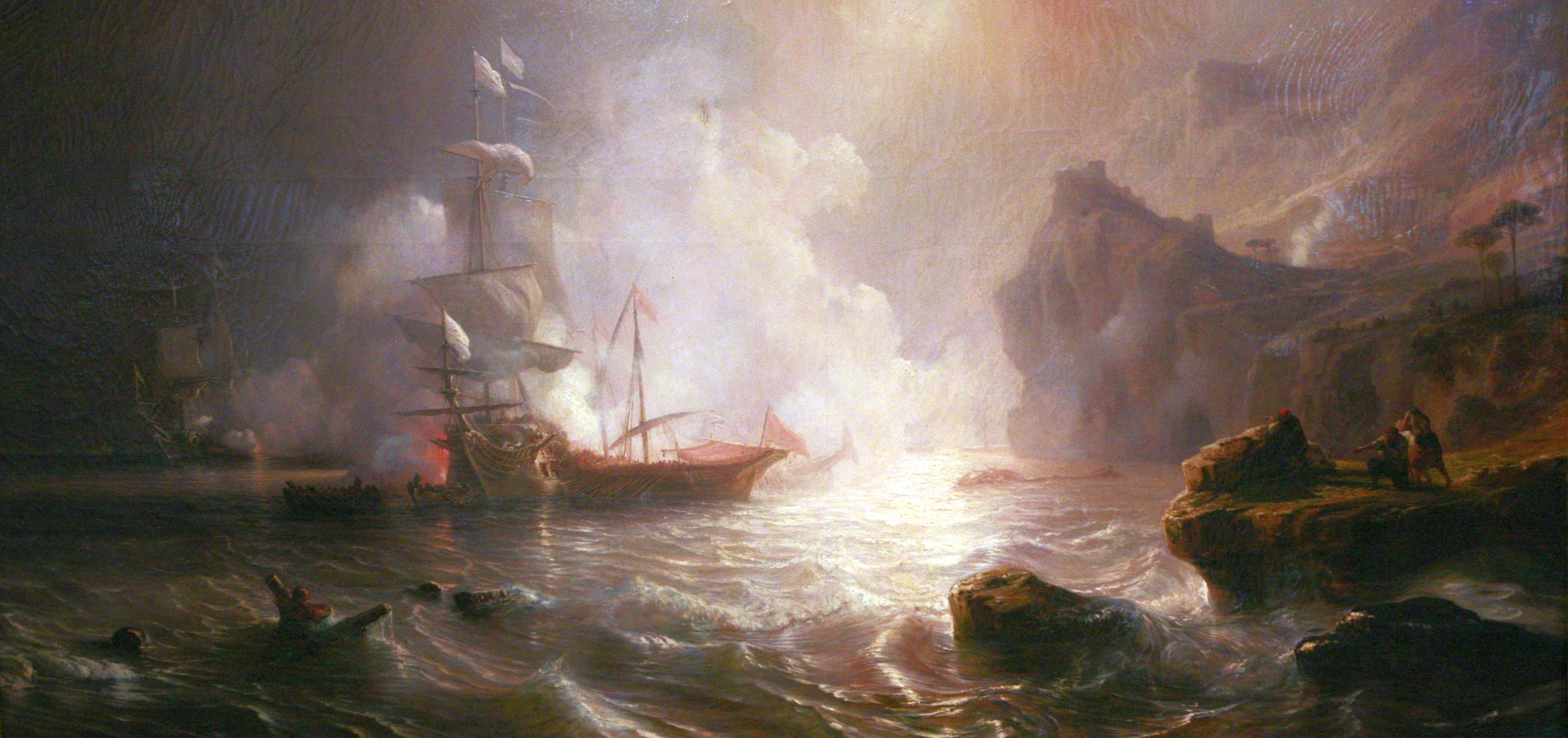
Many Moriscos joined the Barbary pirates in North Africa.

Scholars have noted that many Moriscos joined the Barbary Corsairs, who had a network of bases from Morocco to Libya and often attacked Spanish shipping and the Spanish coast. In the Corsair Republic of Sale, they became independent of Moroccan authorities and profited from trade and piracy.

Morisco mercenaries in the service of the Moroccan Sultan, using arquebuses, crossed the Sahara and conquered Timbuktu and the Niger Curve in 1591. Their descendants formed the ethnic group of the Arma. A Morisco worked as a military advisor to Sultan Al-Ashraf Tumanbay II of Egypt (the last Egyptian Mamluk Sultan) during his struggle against the Ottoman invasion in 1517, led by Sultan Selim I. The Morisco military advisor advised Sultan Tumanbay to use infantry armed with guns instead of depending on cavalry. Arabic sources recorded that Moriscos of Tunisia, Libya, and Egypt joined Ottoman armies. Many Moriscos of Egypt joined the army in the time of Muhammad Ali of Egypt.

Modern studies in population genetics have attributed unusually high levels of recent North African ancestry in modern Spaniards to Moorish settlement during the Islamic period and, more specifically, to the substantial proportion of Morisco population which remained in Spain and avoided expulsion.

=== Moriscos in Spain after the expulsion ===
It is impossible to know how many Moriscos remained after the expulsion, with traditional Spanish historiography considering that none remained and initial academic estimates such as those of Lapeyre offering figures as low as ten or fifteen thousand remaining. However, recent studies have been challenging the traditional discourse on the supposed success of the expulsion in purging Spain of its Morisco population. Indeed, it seems that expulsion met widely differing levels of success, particularly between the two major Spanish crowns of Castile and Aragón and recent historical studies also agree that both the original Morisco population and the number of them who avoided expulsion is higher than was previously thought.

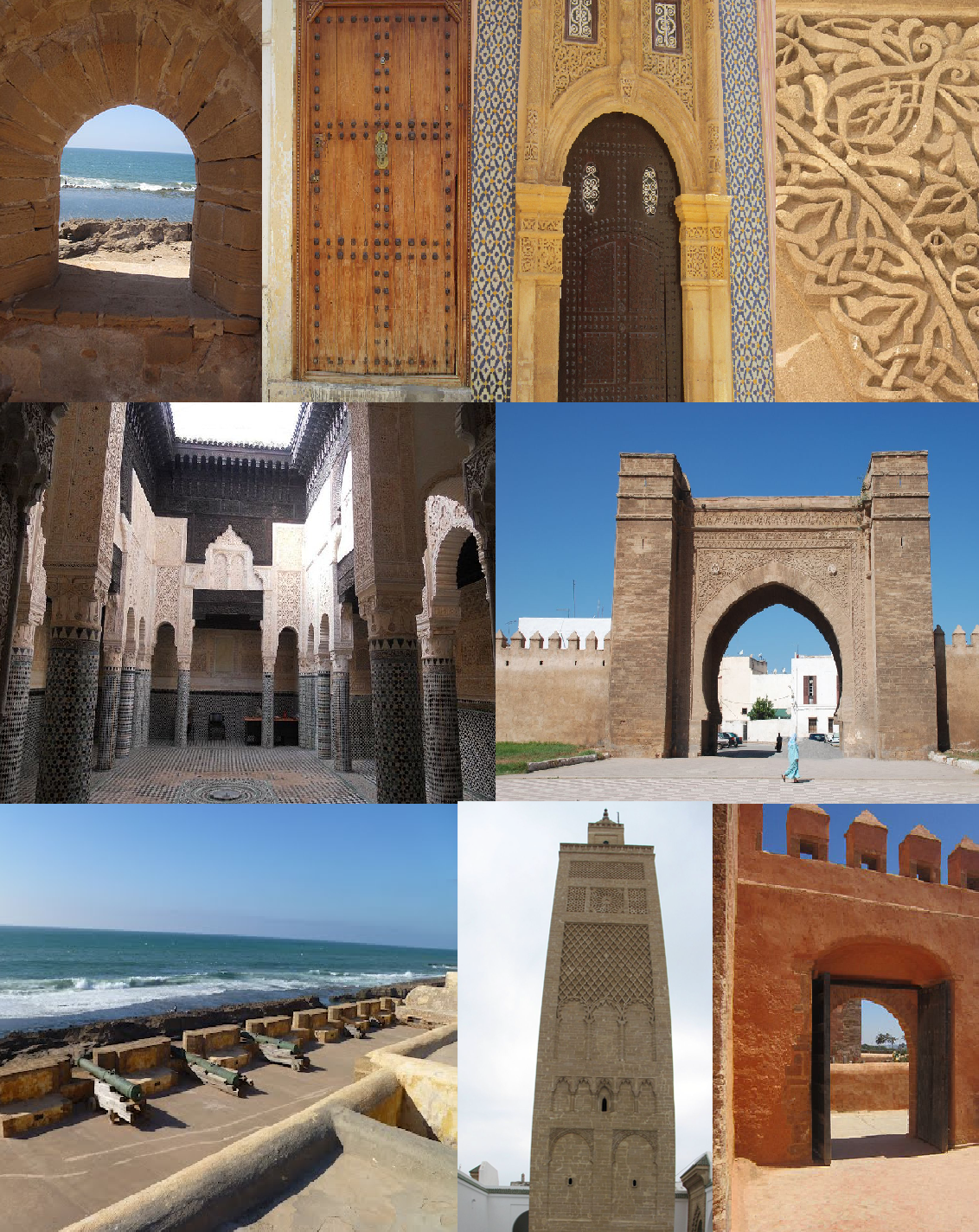
Monuments in Sale where many Moriscos sought refuge and founded the Republic of Salé.

One of the earliest re-examinations of Morisco expulsion was carried out by Trevor J. Dadson in 2007, devoting a significant section to the expulsion in Villarrubia de los Ojos in southern Castille. Villarubia's entire Morisco population were the target of three expulsions which they managed to avoid or from which they succeeded in returning from to their town of origin, being protected and hidden by their non-Morisco neighbours. Dadson provides numerous examples, of similar incidents throughout Spain whereby Moriscos were protected and supported by non-Moriscos and returned en masse from North Africa, Portugal, or France to their towns of origin.

A similar study on the expulsion in Andalusia concluded it was an inefficient operation which was significantly reduced in its severity by resistance to the measure among local authorities and populations. It further highlights the constant flow of returnees from North Africa, creating a dilemma for the local inquisition who did not know how to deal with those who had been given no choice but to convert to Islam during their stay in Muslim lands as a result of the Royal Decree. Upon the coronation of Philip IV, the new king gave the order to desist from attempting to impose measures on returnees and in September 1628 the Council of the Supreme Inquisition ordered inquisitors in Seville not to prosecute expelled Moriscos "unless they cause significant commotion."

An investigation published in 2012 sheds light on the thousands of Moriscos who remained in the province of Granada alone, surviving both the initial expulsion to other parts of Spain in 1571 and the final expulsion of 1604. These Moriscos managed to evade in various ways the royal decrees, hiding their true origin thereafter. More surprisingly, by the 17th and 18th centuries much of this group accumulated great wealth by controlling the silk trade and also holding about a hundred public offices. Most of these lineages were nevertheless completely assimilated over generations despite their endogamic practices. A compact core of active crypto-Muslims was prosecuted by the Inquisition in 1727, receiving comparatively light sentences. These convicts kept alive their identity until the late 18th century.

The attempted expulsion of Moriscos from Extremadura was deemed a failure, with the exception of the speedy expulsion of the Moriscos of the town of Hornachos who would become the founders of the Republic of Salé in modern-day Morocco. Extremaduran Moriscos benefited from systematic support from authorities and society throughout the region and numerous Moriscos avoiding deportation while whole communities such as those of Alcántara temporarily shifted across the border to Portugal only to return later. The expulsion between 1609–1614, therefore, did not come close to its objective of eliminating Morisco presence from the region.

Similar patterns are observed in a detailed examination of the Expulsion in the southeastern Region of Murcia, large swathes of which were of Morisco majority. Morisco integration had reached high levels at the time of expulsion, they formed a strong socio-economic block with complex family ties and good-neighbourly relations. This resulted in the possibility of return, with few exceptions, to be offered and taken by a majority of Moriscos expelled. Although some were initially persecuted upon return, by 1622 they were no longer given any trouble from authorities.

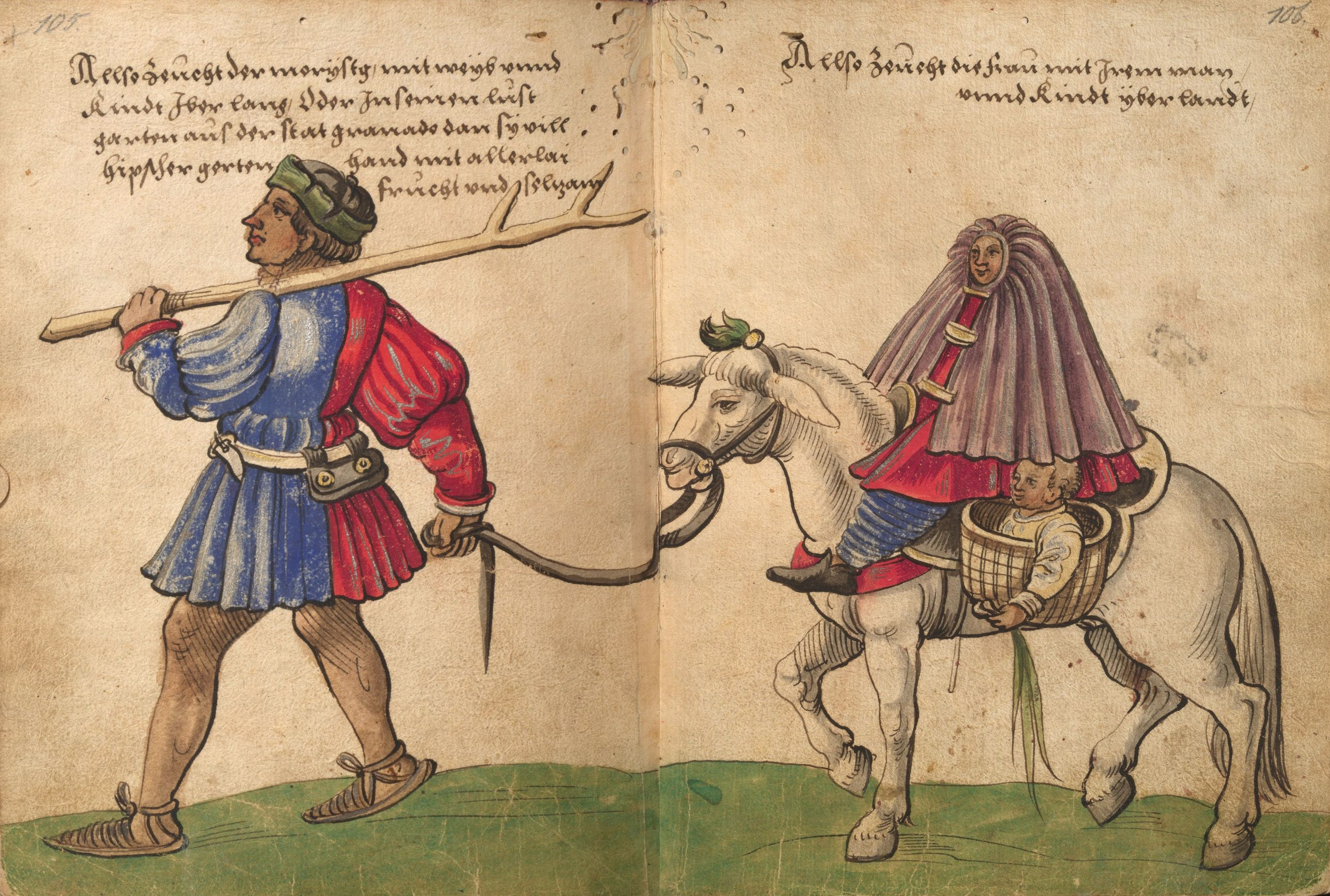
"Moriscos in Granada", drawn by Christoph Weiditz (1529)

Recent genetic studies of North African admixture among modern-day Spaniards have found high levels of North African (Berber) and sub-Saharan African admixture among Spanish and Portuguese populations as compared to the rest of southern and western Europe, and such admixture does not follow a North-South gradient as one would initially expect, but more of an East-West one.

While the large population of Moroccans who descend from the Moriscos have remained acutely aware and proud of their Andalusian roots, the Moriscos' identity as a community was wiped out in Spain, be it via either expulsion or absorption by the dominant culture. Nevertheless, a journalistic investigation over the past years has uncovered existing communities in rural Spain (more specifically in the provinces of Murcia and Albacete) which seem to have maintained traces of their Islamic or Morisco identity, secretly practicing a debased form of Islam as late as the 20th century, as well as conserving Morisco customs and unusual Arabic vocabulary in their speech.

The ineffectiveness of the expulsion in the lands of Castile nevertheless contrasts with that of the Crown of Aragón (modern day Catalonia, Aragón and Valencian Community) in Eastern Spain. Here the expulsion was accepted much more wholeheartedly and instances of evasion and/or return have so far not been considered demographically important. This explains why Spain was not affected on the whole by the expulsion whereas the Valencian Community was devastated and never truly recovered as an economic or political powerhouse of the kingdom, ceding its position, within the Crown of Aragón, to the Catalan counties to the north, which never had a sizeable Morisco population to begin with.

=== Modern-day ethnicities in Spain associated with Moriscos ===
A number of ethnicities in northern Spain have historically been suspected of having Morisco roots. Among them are the Vaqueiros de Alzada of Asturias, the Mercheros (present throughout northern and western Spain), the Pasiegos of the Pas Valley in the mountains of Cantabria and the Maragatos of the Maragatería region of Leon. Genetic studies have been performed on the latter two, both showing higher levels of North African ancestry than the average for Iberia, although only in the case of the Pasiegos was there a clear differentiation from adjacent populations.

=== Moriscos and population genetics ===
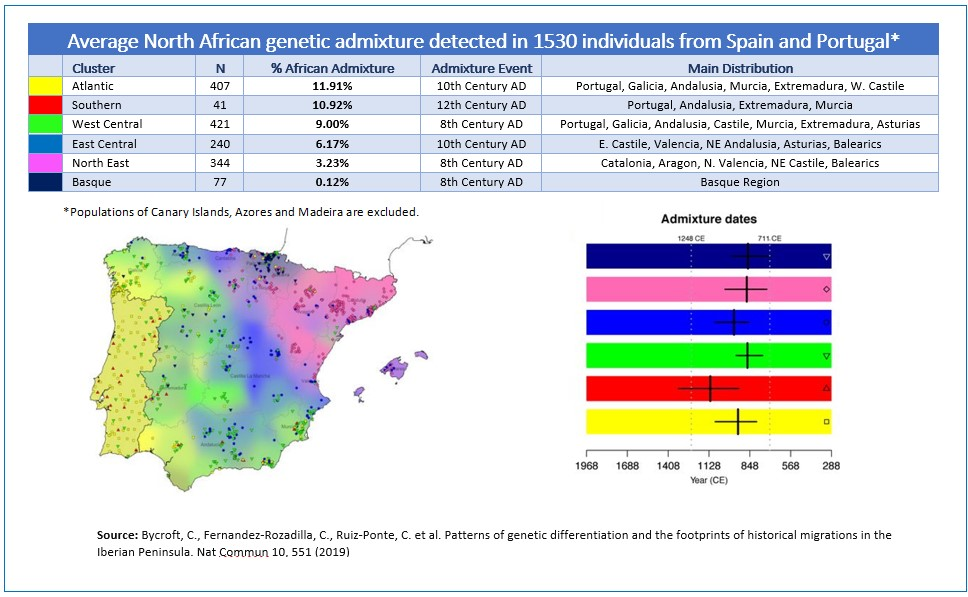
Distribution of North African Admixture in the Iberian Peninsula

Spain's Morisco population was the last population who self-identified and traced its roots to the various waves of Muslim conquerors from North Africa. Historians generally agree that, at the height of Muslim rule, Muladis or Muslims of pre-Islamic Iberian origin were likely to constitute the large majority of Muslims in Spain, with over 75% of Al-Andalusian Iberians estimated to have converted by the 11th century. Studies in population genetics which aim to ascertain Morisco ancestry in modern populations search for Iberian or European genetic markers among contemporary Morisco descendants in North Africa, and for North African genetic markers among modern-day Spaniards.

A wide number of recent genetic studies of modern-day Spanish and Portuguese populations have ascertained significantly higher levels of North African admixture in the Iberian peninsula than in the rest of the European continent. which is generally attributed to Islamic rule and settlement of the Iberian peninsula. Common North African genetic markers which are relatively high frequencies in the Iberian peninsula as compared to the rest of the European continent are Y-chromosome E1b1b1b1(E-M81) and Macro-haplogroup L (mtDNA) and U6. Studies coincide that North African admixture tends to increase in the south and west of the peninsula, peaking in parts of Andalusia, Extremadura, Southern Portugal and Western Castile. Distribution of North African markers are largely absent from the northeast of Spain as well as the Basque country. The uneven distribution of admixture in Spain has been explained by the extent and intensity of Islamic colonization in a given area, but also by the varying levels of success in attempting to expel the Moriscos in different regions of Spain, as well as forced and voluntary Morisco population movements during the 16th and 17th centuries.

As for tracing Morisco descendants in North Africa, to date there have been few genetic studies of populations of Morisco origins in the Maghreb.

A recent study of various Tunisian ethnic groups has found that all were indigenous North African, including those who self-identified as Andalusians.

=== Descendants and Spanish citizenship ===
In October 2006, the Andalusian Parliament asked the three parliamentary groups that form the majority to support an amendment that would ease the way for Morisco descendants to gain Spanish citizenship. It was originally made by IULV-CA, the Andalusian branch of the United Left. The proposal was refused.

Spanish Civil Code Art. 22.1 do provide concessions to nationals of the Ibero-American countries, Andorra, the Philippines, Equatorial Guinea, and Portugal, specifically it enables them to seek citizenship after two years rather than the usual ten years required for residence in Spain. Additionally similar concessions were provided later to the descendants of Sephardic Jews.

According to the President of Andalusi Historical Memory Association, Nayib Loubaris, this measure could potentially cover as many as 600 family surnames of Morisco origin in Morocco, who would have moved to Rabat and various other cities across the country. Such families are recognizable by their Spanish surnames such as Torres, Loubaris (from Olivares), Bargachi (from Vargas), Buano (from Bueno), Sordo, Denia, and Lucas. Earlier estimates had involved larger figures of potential descendants (up to 5 million in Morocco and an indeterminate number from other Muslim countries).

Since 1992 some Spanish and Moroccan historians and academics have been demanding equitable treatment for Moriscos similar to that offered to Sephardic Jews. The bid was welcomed by Mansur Escudero, the chairman of the Islamic Council of Spain.

== Notable Moriscos and Morisco descendants ==
- Aben Humeya, born with the Christian name Fernando de Córdoba y Válor, leader of the Morisco revolt.
- Faraj ibn Faraj, a Muslim commander during the Rebellion of the Alpujarras (1568–1571)
- Young Man of Arévalo, crypto-Muslim author in Spain.
- Abdelkader Pérez, Moroccan ambassador to England.
- Yusuf Biscaino, diplomat and translator in the service of the Moroccan Sultan Mulay Zidan.
- Joan Malet, Catalan Morisco witch-hunter.
- Abdelkhalek Torres, Moroccan nationalist leader during the Spanish protectorate, Moroccan ambassador to Spain and Egypt and Minister of Justice.
- Muhammad Torres, Moroccan diplomat, representative of the sultan in Tangier, and foreign minister of Morocco at the turn of the 20th century.
- Leo Africanus, Berber Andalusi diplomat and author
- Ahmed Balafrej, Moroccan politician
- Omar Balafrej, Moroccan politician, great nephew of Ahmed Balafrej.
- Si Kaddour Benghabrit, Algerian religious leader, translator and interpreter.
- Rodolfo Gil Benumeya, Spanish journalist, essayist, Arabist and historian.
- Rodolfo Gil Grimau, Spanish Arabist.

== See also ==
- Al-Andalus, the part of the Iberian Peninsula under Islamic rule.
- Alhambra Decree
- Aljamiado, a Romance language written in Arabic characters.
- Almogavars, rough Christian soldiers
- Andalusian Arabic, the former language of Moriscoes.
- Arab Christians
- Castas
- Conversos, the baptized Jews and Muslims of the Iberian Peninsula and their descendants.
- Crypto-Christianity
- Crypto-Islam
- Crypto-Judaism
- Forced conversion
- Hispano-Moresque ware
- Hornachos, a village inhabited by Moriscos.
- Genetic history of the Iberian Peninsula
- Genetic studies of Moroccans
- Limpieza de sangre, the rules of ethnic discrimination against Conversos.
- Marranos, baptized Jews
- Monfi, the Moriscos who lived from banditry
- Moors, the Muslim inhabitants of the Iberian Peninsula and North Africa.
- Morisco Revolt
- Mozarabs, Christians under Islamic rule.
- Mozarabic language, the Romance language spoken in Al-Andalus.
- Mudéjar, Muslims under Christian rule
- Muwallad, a Christian converted to Islam after the Islamic conquest
- Persecution of Muslims
- Philip III of Spain
- Reconquista, the conquest of Al-Andalus by the Christians of the North.
- Torna atrás
- Treaty of Granada (1491)

== Bibliography ==
- Barletta, Vincent. Covert Gestures: Crypto-Islamic Literature as Cultural Practice in Early Modern Spain. Minneapolis: University of Minnesota Press, 2005.
- Bernabé-Pons, Luis Fernando, Expulsion of the Muslims from Spain, EGO – European History Online, Mainz: Institute of European History, 2020, retrieved: March 17, 2021 (pdf).
- Carr, Matthew (2009). The Purging of Muslim Spain. The New Press. ISBN 978-1-59558-361-1.
- Casey. James."Moriscos and the Depopulation of Valencia" Past & Present No. 50 (Feb., 1971), pp. 19–40 online
- Catlos, Brian A. (2014). Muslims of Medieval Latin Christendom, c. 1050–1614. Cambridge University Press. ISBN 978-0-521-88939-1.
- Chejne, Anwar G. Islam and the West, the Moriscos: A Cultural and Social History (1983)
- Dadson, Trevor J. (2014). Tolerance and Coexistence in Early Modern Spain: Old Christians and Moriscos in the Campo de Calatrava. Boydell & Brewer Ltd. ISBN 978-1-85566-273-5.
- Gárcia-Arenal, Mercedes; Wiegers, Gerard, eds. (2014). The Expulsion of the Moriscos from Spain: A Mediterranean Diaspora. Leiden & Boston: Brill. ISBN 978-90-04-27935-3. Individual chapters:

- Vincent, Bernard (2014). The Geography of the Morisco Expulsion: A Quantitative Study.

- Haliczer, Stephen (1990). Inquisition and Society in the Kingdom of Valencia, 1478–1834. University of California Press. ISBN 978-0-520-06729-5.
- Harvey, L. P. (2005). Muslims in Spain, 1500 to 1614. University of Chicago Press. ISBN 978-0-226-31963-6.
- Hess, Andrew C. "The Moriscos: An Ottoman Fifth Column in Sixteenth-Century Spain." American Historical Review 74#1 (1968): 1–25. online
- Jónsson, Már. "The expulsion of the Moriscos from Spain in 1609–1614: the destruction of an Islamic periphery." Journal of Global History 2.2 (2007): 195–212.
- Lea, Henry Charles (1901). The Moriscos of Spain: Their Conversion and Expulsion. Philadelphia: Lea Brothers & Company.
- Lynch, John (1969). Spain under the Habsburgs. Vol. (vol. 2). Oxford, England: Alden Mowbray Ltd. pp. 42–51.
- Perry, Mary Elizabeth. The Handless Maiden: Moriscos and the Politics of Religion in Early Modern Spain, Princeton, NJ, Princeton University Press, 2005.
- Phillips, Carla Rahn. "The Moriscos of La Mancha, 1570–1614." The Journal of Modern History 50.S2 (1978): D1067–D1095. online
- Monter, E. William (2003). Frontiers of Heresy: The Spanish Inquisition from the Basque Lands to Sicily. Cambridge University Press. ISBN 978-0-521-52259-5.
- Wiegers, Gerard A. Islamic Literature in Spanish and Aljamiado: Iça of Segovia (fl. 1450), His antecedents and Successors. Leiden: Brill, 1994.
- Wiegers, Gerard A. "Managing Disaster: Networks of the Moriscos during the Process of the Expulsion from the Iberian Peninsula around 1609." Journal of Medieval Religious Cultures 36.2 (2010): 141–168.

=== In Spanish ===
- Domínguez Ortiz, Antonio and Bernard Vincent. Historia de los moriscos: Vida y tragedia de una minoría. Madrid: Alianza, 1978.
- Drummond Braga, Isabel M. R. Mendes. Mouriscos e cristãos no Portugal quinhentista: Duas culturas e duas concepções religiosas em choque. Lisbon: Hugin, 1999.
- García-Arenal, Mercedes. Los moriscos. Madrid: Editora Nacional, 1975.
- Lapeyre, Henry (2011). Geografía de la España morisca (in Spanish). Universitat de València. ISBN 978-84-370-8413-8.
- Bernabé Pons, Luis F., Los moriscos. Conflicto, expulsión y diáspora, Madrid: Catarata, 2009.
- Stallaert, Christiane (1998). Etnogénesis y etnicidad en España: una aproximación histórico-antropológica al casticismo. Barcelona: Proyecto a Ediciones. ISBN 978-84-922335-7-1.
