= Tafilalt expedition =

Moroccan expedition to Tafilalt

Tafilalt expedition (1893)
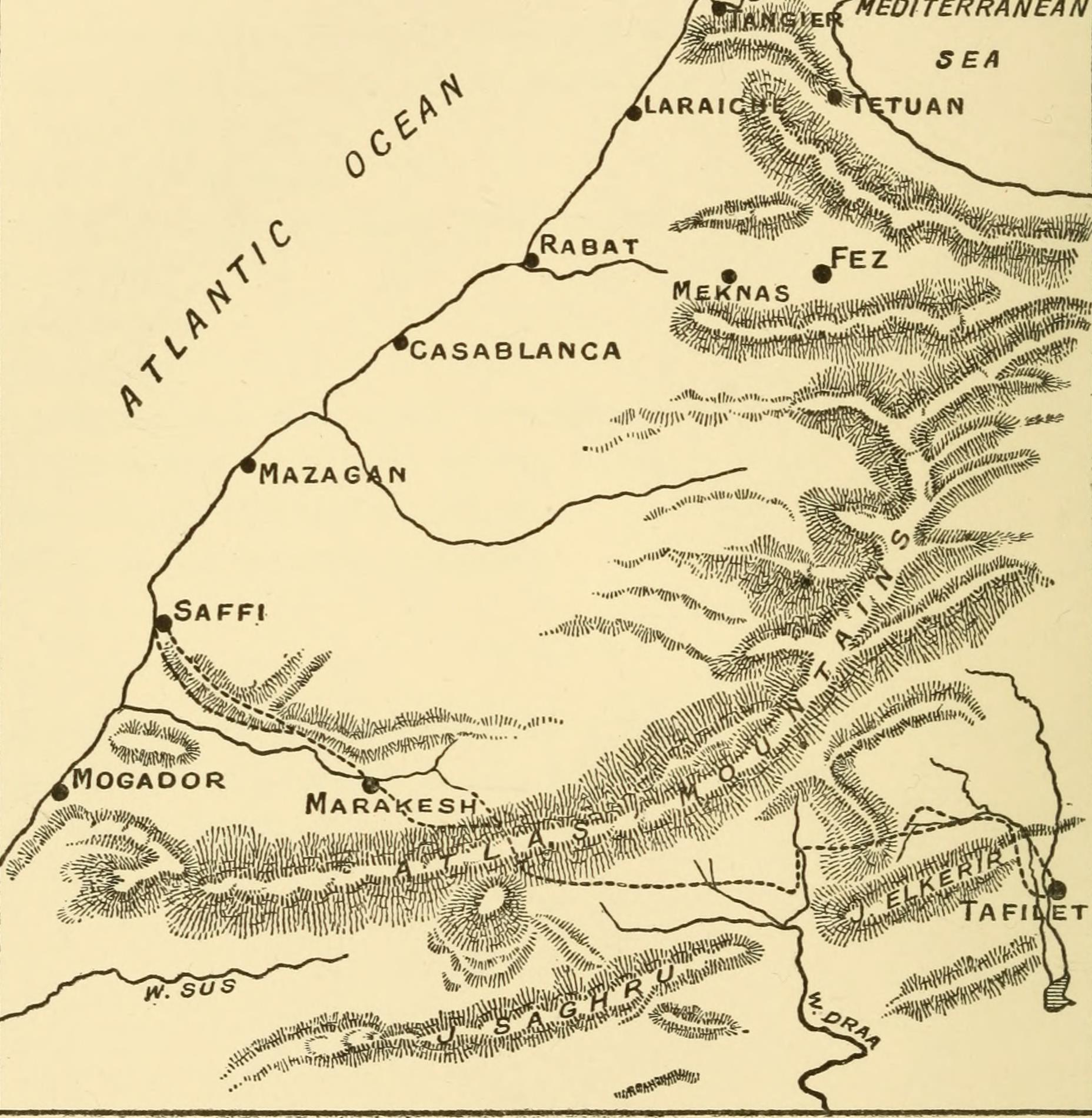
- Map of Morocco (1895).
Date	29 June – 28 December 1893
Location	Tafilalt
Result	Moroccan victory
Territorial changes	Reinforcement of Moroccan authority over trans-Saharan trade routes and the Saharan regions.

Belligerents
Morocco	Aït Atta; Aït Khabbash; 'Alawi shurfa

Commanders and leaders
(Morocco) Moulay Hassan (Morocco) Moulay Mohammed	

The Tafilalt expedition was a large military expedition conducted by Sultan Moulay Hassan of Morocco in the region of Tafilalt in 1893 in the face of French Algerian expansionism. Moulay Hassan revitalized relations between the makhzan and the tribes and villages of the eastern and Saharan frontier lands. The expedition to the Tafilalt in 1893 was sent because the sultan feared that disorder there would provide an excuse for French intervention. An army of 15,000–30,000 marched in a loop from Fez to Marrakesh via the Tafilalt oases in company of the Emir Moulay Mohammed bin Hassan. Little fighting took place, but it was greeted with loyal submissions and the payment of taxes, and so buttressed the sultan’s claims to sovereignty.

== Background ==
As early as 1888, Moulay Hassan considered leading an expedition all the way to Tafilalt. He expressed the wish to visit the tombs of his 'Alawi forbears buried in that remote southern oasis and to pray at the tomb of Moulay 'Ali Sharif. Moulay Hassan's expedition also sought to establish direct contact with tribal leaders and enforce law and order. This undertaking was driven by internal political motives, particularly influenced by the actions of the 'Alawi shurfa and the Aït Khabbash of the Aït 'Atta tribe, and the encroachment of the French in Algeria.

== Expedition ==
Moulay Hassan made final plans to leave for Tafilalt in the spring of 1893. He crossed the Atlas Mountains with an army of some 18,000 men. The expedition was also aimed to make direct contacts with tribal leaders, impose a measure of law and order on the region, and, above all, to demonstrate to his subjects and to Europe that the arm of makhzan power reached beyond the High Atlas. Moulay Hassan's expedition was motivated by internal political causes as well and depended heavily on the behavior of two groups in particular, the 'Alawi shurfa and the Aït Khabbash of the Aït 'Atta. The shurfa, despite their religious status, damaged the sultan's prestige by constantly feuding among themselves and splitting into various political factions. Unlike the more peaceful local murabtin, the shurfa were involved in long-lasting blood feuds. Moulay Hassan traveled to Tafilalt with the dual goal of curbing their rebellious behavior and resolving their internal conflicts.

Conditions on the lower Ziz were as tumultuous as ever, and the French were already stepping up their efforts to lay the groundwork for a bloodless occupation of Touat. Therefore, with his court, his army, and his harem in tow, Moulay Hassan set out in June along the Fez-Tafilalt caravan route, subduing and collecting taxes from several of the tribes along the way. He finally arrived in November in the Wad Ifli district in the center of Tafilalt and there erected a sprawling camp, numbering about forty thousand people. He and his ministers spent most of their time meeting with delegations of notables from the surrounding region, hearing complaints and requests, distributing and receiving gifts, and arbitrating disputes.

To the camp came Muhammad al-Amrani and al-'Arbi al-Mni'i, the delegates of the distant eastern tribes, Dawi Mani' and Bni Guil, who were on the front line along the border. The sultan had repeatedly warned them, in 1877, 1880 and 1881, of the activities of the Awlad Sidi Shaykh. Al-'Arbi ben al-Mqadam al-Mni'i was the sultan's advisor in all matters concerning the eastern provinces, and he was his emissary in these regions. The sultan met with delegations from various tribes in the region and attracted one notable of Touat to his camp. The sultan's brother, Moulay Rashid, the Khalifa of Tafilalt between 1862 and 1911, accompanied Moulay Hassan to the royal camp. Some members of the royal entourage were allowed to stay at Moulay Rashid's residence, Ksar Oulad ‘Abd al-Halim, in Rissani.

While Moulay Hassan was conducting the military expedition in Tafilalt and trying to reinforce the action of his representatives in Touat, the occurrence of unrest in Melilla, following which Spain concentrated sufficient troops for a large-scale operation on Morocco, forced the sultan to spare his army to deal with this news. Spanish troops, trying to occupy yet more of the territory granted to them under the Treaty of Wad Ras (1860), had built a fort close to the tomb of an important local marabout, and the Guelaya attacked. The expedition returned to the north by way of Ouarzazate and Marrakesh.

== Aftermath ==
Although the consultations had little success, Sultan Moulay Hassan I's expeditions to the Sous in 1882 and to the Tafilalt expanded the perceptual boundaries of the state and deepened the degree of integration between the makhzan and its outlying areas. The appearance of the sultan in the far corners of the state helped to establish makhzan supremacy over the trans-Saharan trade routes that bisected the Tafilalt, at that moment being closely watched by the French from across the frontier with Algeria. And through face-to-face contact with the local chieftains, the mahalla reestablished the ancient ties of fealty between the 'Alawi sultan and his desert minions.

Returning from Tafilalt with his harka, Moulay Hassan stopped at the Glawi home base at Telouet. Madani al-Glawi gave the sultan and his army much needed hospitality which enabled them to survive their hazardous journey across the snow-covered passes. The sultan rewarded him with a Krupp cannon and modern rifles and appointed him nominal Qaid of Tafilalt, probably with the aim of making him a kind of makhzan watchdog on the region. The Glawis subsequently established closer relations with the government, and they used the weapons against local rivals. In Marrakesh, the Spanish (Martinez Campos) and British ambassadors expressed their wish to be received by His Majesty upon his arrival.

== Bibliography ==
- Abun-Nasr, Jamil M. (1987). A History of the Maghrib in the Islamic Period. Cambridge University Press. ISBN 9780521337670.
- Aouchar, Amina (2003). Le voyage du sultan Moulay Hassan au Tafilalt: (Juin-décembre 1893) (in French). Senso Unico éditions. ISBN 9954838309.
- Dunn, Ross E. (1977). Resistance in the desert : Moroccan responses to French imperialism 1881–1912. Croom Helm. ISBN 978-0-299-07360-2.
- Martin, Alfred-Georges-Paul (1923). Quatre siècles d'histoire marocaine : au Sahara de 1504 à 1902, au Maroc de 1894 à 1912 (in French). F. Alcan.
- Miller, Susan Gilson (2013). A History of Modern Morocco. Cambridge University Press. ISBN 9780521810708.
- Pennell, Richard (2000). Morocco Since 1830: A History. C. Hurst & Co. Publishers. ISBN 9781850654261.
- Rézette, Robert (1975). Le Sahara occidental et les frontières marocaines (in French). Nouvelles Editions Latines. ISBN 9782723317368.
- Trout, Frank E. (1969). Morocco's Saharan Frontiers. Librairie Droz. ISBN 9782600044950.
