= Muhammad ibn Sharif =

Moroccan sultan

سيدي محمد بن شريف Sidi Mohammed ibn Sharif

Sultan of Tafilalt
- Reign: 1641–1664
- Successor: Moulay Rachid

Emir of Tafilalt
- Reign: 1640-1641
- Predecessor: Moulay Sharif ibn Ali
- Born: Tafilalt, Morocco
- Died: 2 August 1664; Angad plains, Morocco
- House: House of Alaoui
- Father: Moulay Sharif ibn Ali
- Religion: Islam

Sultan Sidi Muhammad ibn Sharif ibn Ali ibn Muhammad (Arabic: سيدي محمد بن شريف بن علي بن محمد) (? – 2 August 1664) was an Arab ruler of Tafilalt, Morocco between 1636 and 1664. He was the eldest son of Moulay Sharif ibn Ali and came to power when his father stepped down. He was killed on 2 August 1664 in a battle on the plain of Angad by troops of his half-brother Moulay Rachid.

== Character ==
The Zaouia of Dila people, his longtime rivals, had described the posthumous Sidi Mohammed I in the following terms:

“He (Sidi Mohammed I) was a real gyrfalcon as insensitive to the simoom of the night as to the overwhelming heat of the summer sun, and such as the golden eagle, he was constantly perched on the top of rocks. The possession of wealth sufficed him only if he cut off heads. His bravery was famous, and with that he was vigorous and solidly membered: one could never stand up to him in hand-to-hand fighting, nor make him let go a defensive position.”

During one of the sieges of Tabouasamt, people tell the tale that Sidi Mohammed put his hands in one of the holes issued on one of the citadel's walls, and a considerable number of his soldiers managed to climb the wall so much his arms were solid. This was narrated by Mohammed al-Ifrani in Nozhet Elhadi, the latter also described Sidi Mohammed I as a generous man.

== Biography ==
=== Military Campaigns ===
Amidst the twilight of the Saadi Dynasty, in 1631 Tafilalt inhabitants recognized his father Moulay Sharif as Emir of Tafilalt. It was the first time for a member of the Alawiyin Al Filaliyin family to hold political power, they were until then the spiritual leaders of Sijilmasa.

In 1633 Sidi Mohammed's father Moulay Sharif called his good friend Bou Hasen (Aboulhasen Ali ben Mohammed Essoussi Essemlali), Master of Dra’a and Sous, for help with the people of the Tabouasamt citadel in Tafilalet who would still reject his authority. Tabouasamt people called the Dilaites. Both responded to their call, but no fight followed. Tabouasamt people put meticulous effort at aiming to break the intimate links of friendship between Moulay Sharif and Bou Hasen. Their efforts paid off as Bou Hasen and Moulay Sharif's relationship began to fall apart and reasons of discord between the two men multiplied.

Sidi Mohammed not fooled by their vile plots, took revenge on Tabouasamt people's deeds by assaulting them at night and killing the inhabitants by surprise. With 200 horsemen after simulating a departure to another direction, they went back on their paces and began their assault. His soldiers made a small breach on the wall by which the troops managed to enter the citadel, they climbed the wall as well. Once inside, they massacred part of the sleeping garrison and looted its treasure. Sidi Mohammed informed his father of his capture of the citadel. The following day a procession took place in the citadel where Moulay Sharif went with his men. Following their defeat Tabouasamt people submitted to Moulay Sharif's authority and recognized him as their sovereign.

When Bou Hasen heard of the assault on Tabouasamt people he became abased and got very angry. He wrote to Bou Bker, Governor of Sijilmasa, and ordered him to find a way of capturing Moulay Sharif and send him to himself as prisoner. The Governor, his partisan, carried out the order and captured Moulay Sharif and sent him to Bou Hasen in Sous a prisoner. Starting 1635, Sidi Mohammed started gathering an army, soldiers gradually joined from Sijilmasa and its surroundings. He became the de facto ruler of Tafilalet since 1636. When his father was a captive, Sidi Mohammed was preparing to exterminate the inhabitants of Tabouasamt and root out this ulcer. He sieged the citadel and managed to definitely take it.

In 1637, when Sidi Mohammed amassed the huge sum of money he bought his father's freedom and went back home to Sijilmasa. Once his father was free and far from the Sous, with the new riches he looted from his previous assault on Tabouasamt he was finishing preparing his army for war. Bou Hasen's men oppression and greed on the Sijilmasa people made all the inhabitants ally their cause to Sidi Mohammed's and come and expand the ranks of his army. War preparations over, he invited his men to oust of Sijilmasa all Bou Hasen's partisans. His men followed him as they were also motivated by the mistreatment they suffered in the Sous people's hands. After fierce fighting they managed to drive out of Sijilmasa all partisans of Bou Hasen. This battle took place some time before his coronation.

=== Reign ===
Sidi Mohammed's allegiance ceremony took place April 23, 1640, he was crowned Emir of Tafilalet. Upon coronation, he wasted no time, and went to battle his long time enemy Bou Hasen, the Master of Dra'a. After a fierce battle between the two armies, Emir Sidi Mohammed was victorious and consequently annexed the Dra’a region to his Emirate. The defeated Aboulhasen Ali ben Mohammed Essoussi fled to Illigh in Sous. Less than a year later Sidi Mohammed embarked in a northern expedition and conquered Oujda. The city was under Ottoman control and upon conquering it he became Sultan of Tafilalt as Oujda is an imperial city. In 1647, a peace treaty signed with the Ottomans of Algiers delimited the two states borders at Tafna River.

Sidi Mohammed embarked on an eastern Saharan expedition and conquered the Emirate of Tuat in 1652. Tuat, unlike Sijilmasa is an oasis where drought would never affect water supplies for inhabitants. Tuatsi developed a water draining technology which allowed them to extract water from groundwater. This made them immune to droughts. Also Tuat was prosperous of the Trans-Saharan trade, caravans would rest in this oasis before continuing northward towards Sijilmasa or Tlemcen. These were enough reasons for Sidi Mohammed to covet annexing Tuat which he did first in 1645 and secondly in 1652 at which point he assigned permanent notaries (quwaad in Arabic) to the oasis.

During his reign he fought and clashed many times against the Zaouia of Dila, the Sultanate of Tafilalt and the Dilaites became rivalling enemies in the region. In 1646, defeated in battle by the Dila’i leader Mohammed al-Hajj bin Mohammed bin Abu Bakr, Sidi Mohammed had to suffer the sack of Sijilmasa by the Dilaite troops. This was the lowest point of his reign. Peace broke up but the Alaouites lost much territory to the Dilaites: the territories below El Ayach Mountain were given to the Dilaites while the upper districts were kept for the Alaouites of Sultan Sidi Mohammed. In the peace treaty the Dilaites swore never to use arms against their new subject and they went back home. Important to note is that his younger half-brother Moulay Rachid once a grown man blamed him, the Sultan, to have let the sacred city of their ancestors be destroyed by some Berber troops. It became the starting point of their long rivalry.

The Dilaites left upon the signing of the peace treaty. However Sidi Mohammed perjured these oaths by attacking Cheikh Moghfir (Master of the Oulad Aissa District conceded to the Dilaites after the 1646 peace treaty) and by violating other oaths he swore to respect. For in Sidi Mohammed's opinion, he owed nothing to the Dilaites since they had defiled Sijilmasa the pelvis of Sharifs. A threat letter from the Dilaites followed, in it they threatened him and signaled of their march against him. As a response to the threat letter sent by the Dilaites, Sidi Mohammed argued that it was them who rekindle the fire of war by their deeds. And that this letter is the last step of him for peacemaking otherwise war they should have. The Dilaites went back home, but in 1649 Sidi Mohammed continued his open mockery of the peace treaty. This brought him to be summoned by the Fassi who swore allegiance to him (Bay'ah in Arabic), he spent some time in Fez (part of the Dilaite State). Mohammed al-Hajj Al Dila'i upon hearing the Fassi had proclaimed him Sultan marched against him and near Fez a battle went down between Sidi Mohammed's troops and the Dilaites at Dahr Erremka on August 19, 1649. Sidi Mohammed was defeated as well as the Fassi his allies, he went back to Sijilmasa. Following their defeat the Fassi recognized Mohammed al-Hajj as their leader (he became Sultan only in 1659) once again and he sent his son Ahmed ould Elhadj as Governor to Fez to retrieve order. The latter died before his father, the leader, so his son Mohammed ould Ahmed succeeded him as Governor.

=== Later reign and death ===
Sidi Mohammed's father Moulay Sharif died June 1659 at Sijilmasa, upon his death he was once again proclaimed Sultan. At that point in time his rivalry with his younger half-brother Moulay Rachid increased to a state where the latter fled Sijilmasa fearing for his life. Moulay Rachid came to find refuge with the Arabs of the Angad Plain.

In the early 1660s Morocco's political climate was now composed of three poles of powers who were now looking of domination over the other: the Dilaites, Khadir Ghaïlan of Gharb (or Western Rif) and the Alaouites of Sidi Mohammed. The Dilaite Sultan Mohammed al-Hajj al-Dila'i died in Fez in 1662. El Doraidi who commanded a corps of Dilaites troops, rebelled with his tribe and made himself Sultan of Fez. In 1663, the son of the deceased Dilaite Sultan tried to win back the city but failed, it was the beginning of the Dilaite's fall. In the second half of 1663, Sidi Mohamed put camp at Azrou where Ulamas and Sharifs of Fez swore allegiance to him. However, the inhabitants of Fez made the commitment to Al Doraidi to reject Sidi Mohammed's authority. Al Doraidi wanted to nullify Sidi Mohammed's swearing of allegiance by the Fassi elite and succeeded at it. Sidi Mohammed went back to Sijilmasa and continued ruling over his territory.

Meanwhile Moulay Rachid who had taken refuge from Sidi Mohammed since 1659 came to find followers among the Arabs of the Angad Plain and proclaimed himself Sultan in 1664. His followers were mainly Maqil and Beni Snassen. Made aware of his brother's location and rebellious achievement in his northern territory, Sidi Mohammed declared war against his brother and journeyed to the Angad Plain to meet him on the battlefield. The battle started August 2, 1664, but barely the battle started that Sidi Mohammed received a bullet to his throat, he immediately perished of this injury. His soldiers were routed then killed or made prisoner, Moulay Rachid was victorious of the battle. When Moulay Rachid found his brother's body he loaded it onto a mount and took it to the Beni Snassen for burial. He was deeply saddened by the death of his brother, he washed his corps himself (ghusl ritual) and mourned him. Following the battle, Sidi Mohammed's troops went to enlarge Moulay Rachid's and he became the de facto Sultan. Sidi Mohammed's eldest son tried to succeed him in Sijilmasa but failed following his defeat to Moulay Rachid's 9 months siege of the city. Moulay Rachid was then officially proclaimed Sultan of Tafilalet in 1665.

== Legacy ==
Sidi Mohammed's reign as Sultan of Tafilalet gave the Alaouite the political and military power to succeed at conquering Morocco. He himself nearly succeeded in this achievement but it is his half-brothers Moulay Rachid and Moulay Ismail who became Sultans of Morocco. Sidi Mohammed's son, Sidi Mohammed Saghir, having failed to succeed his father established himself in Bou Semghoun and became Master of it. He is recorded to have commanded this city until at least 1713.

Preceded by Sharif ibn Ali	Sultan of Tafilalt; 1636–1664	Succeeded by Al-Rashid
