= Al-Rashid of Morocco =

First Ruler of Alaouite Dynasty

Al-Rashid of Morocco الرَّشيدُ بْن الشَّرِيفِ
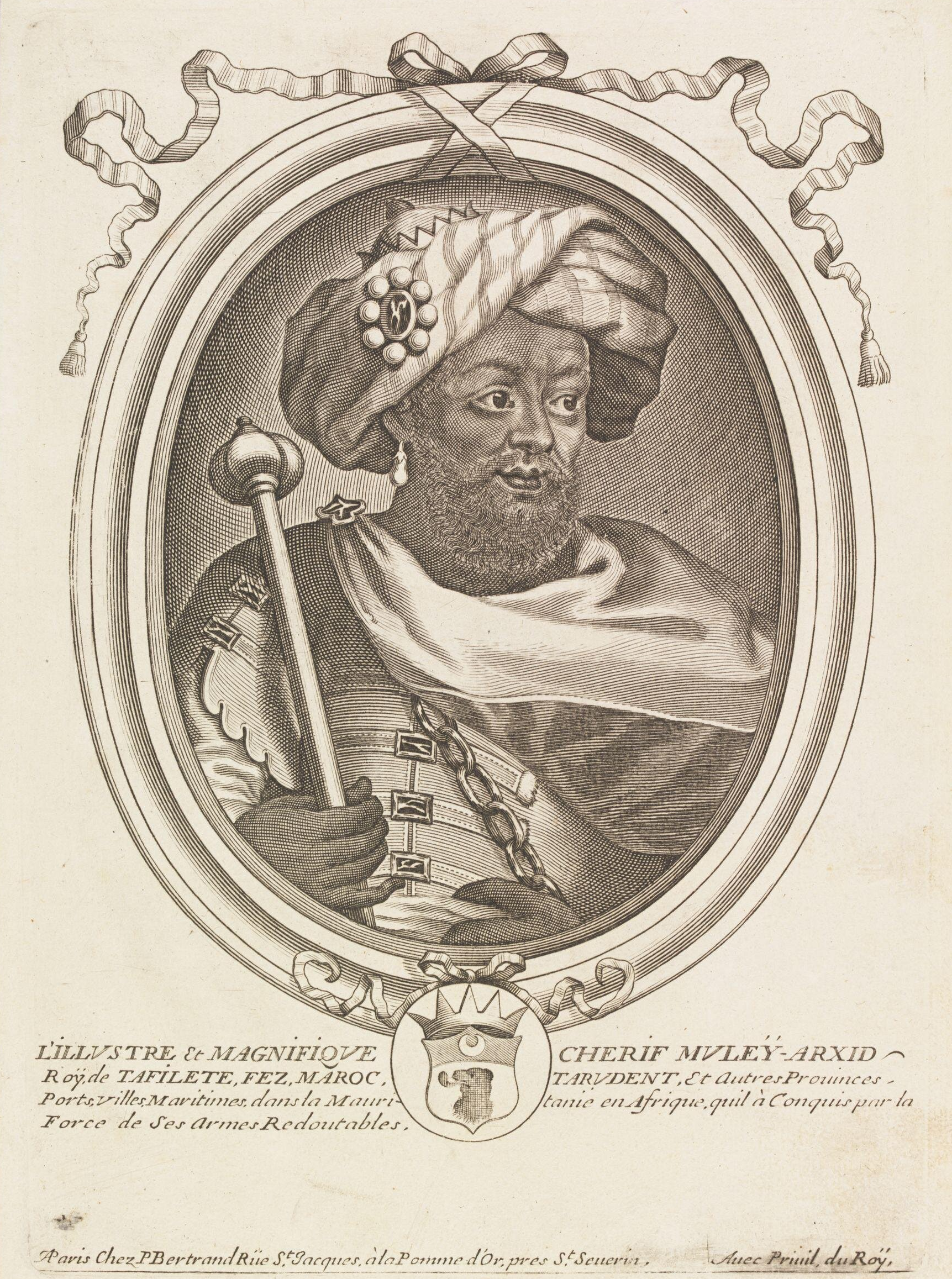
- Engraving by Nicolas de Larmessin, c. 1670

Sultan of Morocco
- Reign: 1666 – 1672
- Predecessor: Mohammed al-Hajj al-Dila'i (Dilaite interlude)
- Successor: Moulay Ismail

Sultan of Tafilalet
- Reign: 1664 – 1666
- Predecessor: Sidi Mohammed
- Born: c. 1631; Tafilalt, Morocco
- Died: 9 April 1672 (aged 41); Marrakesh, Morocco
- Burial: Mausoleum of Sidi Harazem, Fez
Names
- Moulay Al-Rashid bin Moulay Sharif ibn Ali
- House: Alaouite dynasty
- Father: Moulay Sharif ibn Ali
- Religion: Sunni Islam

Moulay Al-Rashid ibn Sharif (Arabic: مولاي الرشيد بن شريف), known as Moulay Al-Rashid or Moulay Rachid (also spelt Mulay, Mulai or Mawlay; b. 1631 – d. 9 April 1672) (Arabic: مولاي الرشيد), sometimes called Tafiletta by the English, was Sultan of Morocco from 1666 to 1672. He was the son of the founder of the 'Alawi dynasty, Moulay Sharif, who took power in the Tafilalt region in 1631.

In 1635, Moulay Rashid's half-brother Sidi Mohammed succeeded their still-living father. During his reign, Sidi Mohammed brought Tafilalt, the Draa River valley, Oujda and the Eastern Sahara region under 'Alawi rule. However, due to internal feuding, war broke out between the brothers, and Sidi Mohammed was killed on the battlefield on 2 August 1664.

Moulay Rashid succeeded his brother as Sultan of Tafilalt, and went on to conquer Taza and assert power in Sijilmasa. He subjugated the northern coastal areas of Morocco, ending the rule of the Dilaites. In 1669, he captured Marrakesh, and thereafter occupied the Sous and the Anti-Atlas, solidifying his control as the first 'Alawi sultan of Morocco.

== Biography ==
=== Youth ===
Moulay Rashid was born in Sijilmasa in 1631, the same year his father Moulay Sharif was crowned Emir of Tafilalt. In 1636, Moulay Sharif lost power, officially abdicating on 23 April 1640 in favor of Sidi Mohammed, his eldest son and Moulay Rashid's brother.

On 28 April 1646, the Dilaite Leader Mohammed al-Hajj defeated Sidi Mohammed in the battle of El Qa'a. Moulay Rashid, aged 15, witnessed the subsequent sack of Sijilmasa by the Dilaite troupes, an event he would later blame on his brother's failures.

=== Rebellions and imprisonment ===
Upon Moulay Sharif's death in 1659, Sidi Mohammed was once again proclaimed Sultan. Moulay Rashid refused to pledge allegiance to him, instead withdrawing from court, along with his partisans Qa'id Bargua Susi, Qa'id Bequal, Qa'id Tufer, and some soldiers. Sidi Mohammed followed them with a cavalry force, intercepting them en route to the Dra’a province. There he captured the group of rebels, imprisoned Moulay Rashid, and paraded his followers on mules with their hock cut off. Moulay Rashid escaped and resumed assembling troops, but Sidi Mohammed captured him once again, imprisoning him in a smaller cell and allowing only his most loyal servants to enter it.

=== Time as a fugitive ===
After some time imprisoned in this cell, Moulay Rashid persuaded one of the servants to assist him in an escape. The two men, one working from each side, managed to break through a wall of the tower, and the servant provided Moulay Rashid with weapons and horses. Once Moulay Rashid was free, he killed his accomplice with a scimitar, unwilling to trust a slave who had betrayed his master.

Fleeing the Sultanate of Tafilalt, Moulay Rashid arrived in the Toudga province, where he offered his services as a soldier to the marabout Sidi Mohammed ben Bou Beker. The sons of Bou Beker realized Moulay Rashid's identity when traveling Tafilalt merchants greeted him as the brother of the sultan; suspecting him to be disguised as part of some plot, they ambushed and tried to kill him. Moulay Rashid escaped the ambush and fled first to Demnat, then to the Dila'iya Zawiya. When the Dilaites demanded that Moulay Rashid leave, fearing he would bring about the destruction of their zawiya, he departed for Azrou. From there, Moulay Rashid traveled to Fez, where El Doraidi gave him great hospitality, before finally arriving in Taza, where he remained until 1664.

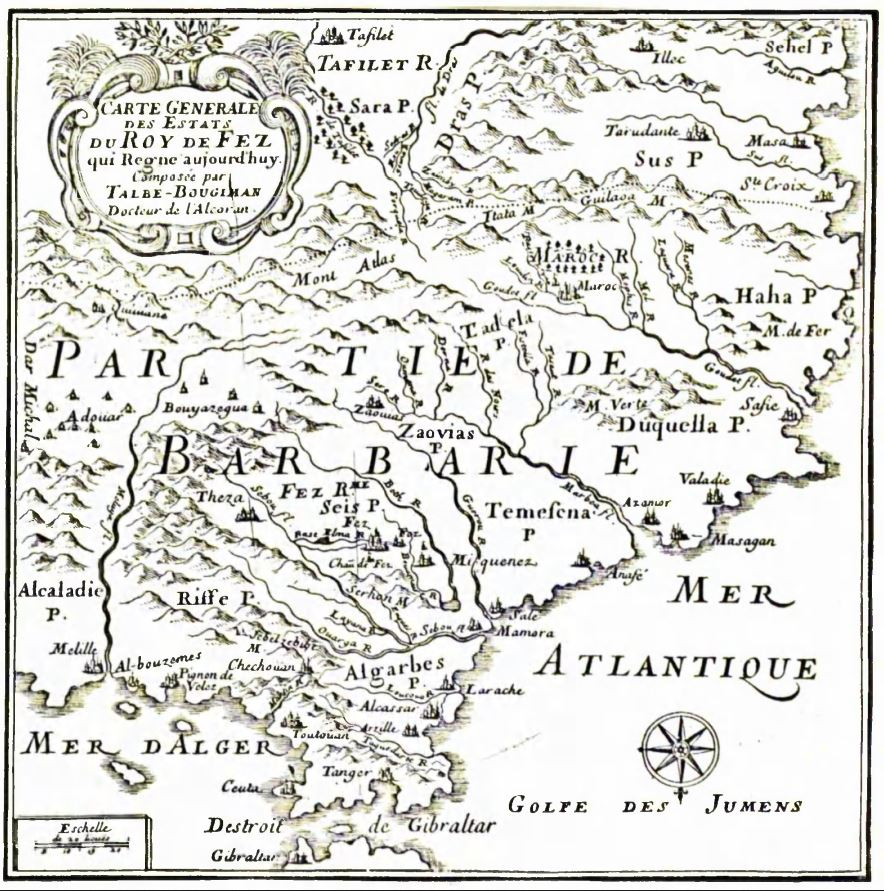
The Germain Mouette ”Bougiman” map of the Maghrib al Aqsa (Morocco), as reproduced in "Les sources inédites de l'Histoire du Maroc", Deuxième Série France. Volume II

In Taza, Moulay Rashid offered his services to Ali Soliman, sheikh of Quiviane. Soliman first gave Moulay Rashid charge of his palace; over time, he entrusted him with his finances, making him Chief House Steward and Chief Justice Secretary.

As Moulay Rashid continued to excel in his tasks, both Ali Soliman and the common people came to hold him in great esteem. He gained a reputation for justice and righteousness, defending orphans and widows while deferring the credit for his achievements to the sheikh. Eventually, Ali Soliman made Moulay Rashid his lieutenant, giving him command of a number of troops and tasking him with the suppression of unrest in his territories.

=== Rise to power ===
Having secured command of troops from Ali Soliman, Moulay Rashid sought to seize power, and resolved to set out by seizing control of the Citadel Dar Ibn Mich'al. References from al-Zayani and the Beni Snassen locate this fortress in the Snassen hill country. In 1664, under the pretext of an official visit to the governor, Moulay Rashid gained access to this citadel with his men, whereupon he seized control and plundered it for its riches. Moulay Rashid distributed some of the loot to his followers, and used the rest to equip his army.

Having received word of Moulay Rashid's rebellion, Ali Soliman gathered an army of 7000 men and marched against him. Moulay Rashid's army comprised only 1500 infantrymen and 600 horsemen, but their morale was high from the recent windfall. Having made camp with his army on a plain near Ali Soliman's position, Moulay Rashid sent some of his men secretly into the enemy camp to advertise the high pay they received. This stratagem succeeded in convincing a number of Ali Soliman's troops to desert to Moulay Rashid's camp, although not enough to close the gap in numbers.

Ali Soliman engaged his men in battle quickly, hoping to defeat Moulay Rashid before more could desert, but they continued to defect during the battle itself. When Ali Soliman tried to escape the battlefield, a group of deserters from his army took him captive and brought him to the victorious Moulay Rashid, who offered to spare his life if Ali Soliman handed over all his wealth. However, when the men returned to Quiviane, Moulay Rashid had Ali Soliman executed, believing that he was concealing part of his fortune. Moulay Rashid kept Ali Soliman's gold for himself, but gave all his silver to his officers to be distributed to the soldiers, saying, ".. A Prince who buries them (riches) in the ground do not deserve to reign; come, my friends, let us share what your pains and affection for myself made you deserve."

Having seized control from Ali Soliman, Moulay Rashid proclaimed himself sultan and established himself in Oujda. His followers, mostly Maqil Arabs and Beni Snassen, swore him oaths of fidelity.

=== Battle of Angad ===
Hearing of his brother's rise to power, and fearing an attack on Sijilmasa, Sidi Mohammed set out north with 5000 cavalrymen and 9000 infantrymen. Moulay Rashid's army had now grown to 2100 cavalrymen and 8000 infantrymen, all voluntary elite troops whom he paid liberally with his new riches. Hoping to gain a tactical advantage to counterbalance his smaller army, Moulay Rashid marched with his army to meet his brother, and made camp in the mountains, where the terrain would prevent a mass cavalry charge.

The battle of Angad took place on the 2nd of August 1664 (H: Friday 9th Muharram 1075) on the eponymous Angad Plain, an arid plateau south of the Mont of the Beni Snassen (Oriental Rif). Soon after the battle began, Sidi Mohammed was killed by a bullet in the neck. The battle quickly became a rout, with Sidi Mohammed's leaderless army killed or taken prisoner by Moulay Rashid's men. After the battle, Moulay Rashid found Sidi Mohammed's corpse. Mourning his brother's death, he washed the body himself, and had it transported to the citadel Dar Ibn Mich'al for burial.

Moulay Rashid was now the de facto Sultan of Tafilalt, and sent emissaries to nearby tribes to have them swear their allegiance to him in Oujda. When Ibn Mich'al's widow came to Oujda, asking Moulay Rashid to release her captive son, Moulay Rashid agreed to do so in exchange for the location of her dead husband's hidden riches. These allowed him to pay and provision his army, now increased by the addition of Sidi Mohammed's surviving men.

=== Conquest of Fez ===
At this time, the political climate in Morocco was tense. Abdul Karim Abu Bakr Al-Shabani, having assassinated his nephew the Saadi sultan Ahmad al-Abbas in 1659, ruled the capital city of Marrakesh and proclaimed himself sultan of lower Morocco, though without popular support. In the Western Rif, General Khadir Ghaïlan clashed with the Dilaite sultan Mohammed al-Hajj, until the death of the latter in 1661 left the Dilaites in a state of rapid decline. In Fez, Caid Al Doraidi led a revolt and proclaimed himself Sultan. Meanwhile, Abdallah Al Doraidi was the officially recognized Master of the Fez Confederation, but controlled only the walled city of Fes Jdid ("New Fez"), without the allegiance of the ulama of Fes el Bali ("Old Fez"). No faction had a clear upper hand for the throne of Morocco.

In all this conflict, Moulay Rashid saw an opportunity to succeed where Sidi Mohamed had fallen short and conquer Morocco. After failing to raise new followers from the Western Rif, Moulay Rashid marched on Taza with his existing army, and seized it after a fierce battle. His next target was Fez, and the Fassi there, remembering Sidi Mohamed's 1663 massacre of the neighboring Hayaina, formed an alliance against him with the Hayaina, Bahlil, and Sefrou tribes. Every household in Fez was ordered to buy a rifle, horses and weapons.

Before Moulay Rashid could march on Fez, however, he had to return to Sijilmasa, where Sidi Mohammed Saghir was claiming his father's sultanate. Moulay Rashid laid siege to the city for nine months, until Sidi Mohammed Saghir fled the devastated city, and in 1665 Moulay Rashid was able to enter without bloodshed. There he received the oaths of the local leaders and was officially proclaimed Sultan of Fafilalt. After restoring the city's ramparts, organizing the guard, and calming the region, Moulay Rashid named his half-brother Moulay Aran as his viceroy, and left the city and the surviving sons of Sidi Mohammed in his custody.

This being accomplished, Moulay Rashid set out once again towards Fez in the spring of 1665, establishing a military base at Taza. The Fassi and Hayaina marched on Taza in response, arriving in April 1665, but were promptly routed and surrendered. In August, Moulay Rashid laid siege to Fez, continuing for eleven months with mixed successes and setbacks. This siege proving more difficult than he had anticipated, Moulay Rashid withdrew his army to concentrate on the central Rif, where Abou Mohammed Abdallah A'aras was trading with the French in violation of Moulay Rashid's ban on trade with European powers. The insurgent leader fled with his family to the protection of the Spanish King in Peñón de Vélez de la Gomera, leaving his son Abdelaziz to lead the fight against Moulay Rashid. After a number of skirmishes, Moulay Rashid defeated the A'aras in March 1666, captured Abdelaziz, and brought him in chains to Taza, where he swore him allegiance.

Moulay Rashid returned to Fez with his army in May 1666, and laid siege to it once again. Caid Abdallah Al Doraidi resisted the assault vigorously, and it became clear to Moulay Rashid that he would not be able to capture Fez through a frontal assault. Instead, he turned to the Mellah of Fez, situated between Fes Jdid and Fes el Bali. The Jews there had suffered steady persecution since the 1659 fall of the Saadi Sultanate, with the Dilaites ordering the destruction of their synagogues, and Caid Al Doraidi taxing them heavily and pillaging their traffic. Moulay Rashid promised them peace and relief from the traditional Jizya tax on their community, and in exchange they agreed to help him obtain access to Fez.

On June 6, 1666, the date he had agreed upon with the Jews, Moulay Rashid ambushed the defenders of Fez near the walls of the Mellah. The sentinels being thus distracted, the Jews opened the gate and let Moulay Rashid enter Fez. His troops having taken control of the first inner wall of the city, Moulay Rashid smashed the second gate with an ax, and, with the advantage of surprise, took complete control of Fes Jdid. Caid Abdallah Al Doraidi fled the city, but Moulay Rashid sent 100 cavalrymen after him, brought him back, and demanded to know where his riches were hidden. When Abdallah Al Doraidi refused to answer, Moulay Rashid had him put to torture, which he endured for many days.

The next day, Moulay Rashid laid siege to Fes el Bali once again. Ibn Esseghir and his son fled the city, followed two days later by Ahmed ben Saleh. Deserted by their leaders, the citizens of Fes el Bali surrendered, swearing allegiance to Moulay Rashid. Moulay Rashid sent his troops to look for the runaway leaders, and, finding them, imprisoned them for a week before having them executed along with some of their followers.

== Reign as Sultan ==
=== Marriages ===
Following his conquest of Fez, Moulay Rashid officially became Sultan of Morocco, receiving the Bay'ah from the ulama and inhabitants of Fez. According to Mohammed al-Ifrani:

"The ceremony over, he granted considerable sums of money to the Ulama and showered them with presents. He deployed the greatest kindness towards the inhabitants of Fez and showed a strong desire to revive the Sunnah by upholding the religious law; this behavior soon placed him high in the minds of the entire population, who dedicated him a lively affection".

Afterwards, he married a daughter of his longtime supporter Sheikh Al-Lawati. Moulay Rashid gave charge of the royal palace to his new father-in-law, and gave him a palace in Fes el Bali for his own use, as well as assigning some of his new brothers-in-law to governing positions.

Moulay Rashid now wished to make allies of the conquered A'aras tribe, in order to secure his hold on central Rif and the northern coast of Morocco. For this purpose, in the autumn of 1666, he had the imprisoned Abdelaziz invite his father Abdallah A'aras to return from his exile in Peñón de Vélez de la Gomera, promising him an esteemed welcome in court. In return, Moulay Rashid not only freed Abdelaziz, he made him a Major and gave him 200 horsemen as a personal guard.

Overjoyed to learn that his son was alive and well, Abdallah A'aras sent his daughter to marry Moulay Rashid, accompanied by a caravan of camels laden with gifts. Moulay Rashid accepted the proposal and sent Abdelaziz out with his guard to receive his sister fittingly. When Abdallah A'aras arrived in person, Moulay Rashid welcomed him by giving him a palace in Fes el Bali and restoring his dominions in the Central Rif region. He also ordered that Abdallah A'aras's tribe be returned from exile. Moulay Rashid's second wedding took place in Fez with great fanfare, and, in honour of the occasion, he pardoned prisoners in all the cities of his kingdom.

Shortly afterward, in October 1666, a delegation arrived from the city of Meknes, surrendering and offering their allegiance to Moulay Rashid. He accepted their surrender, appointing his half-brother Moulay Ismail as viceroy.

=== Conquest of the western Rif ===
Moulay Rashid then began to make preparations for a military campaign in the western Rif. He sent for his nephews to come join him in his conquests; the sons of the late Muhammad ibn Sharif instead took refuge in the mountains, while the sons of Moulay Mehrez, including Moulay Ahmed ben Mehrez, arrived in Fez to a warm welcome. Leaving Si Hamdoun Elmezouâr as Qadi of Fez, Moulay Rashid assembled an army of 8000 cavalrymen and 32000 infantrymen, and set out on a campaign against Khadir Ghaïlan of the western Rif.

Ghaïlan controlled the territories between Ksar el-Kebir, Tétouan, and Ma'amora (present-day Mehdya). Moulay Rashid marched on Ksar el-Kebir, where Ghaïlan met him by the southern road with an army of 20000 veteran soldiers. Ghaïlan exhorted his troops to defend their homeland, but Moulay Rashid's work to sway the people of Rif by an alliance with the A'aras had not been fruitless. As Moulay Rashid maintained his offensive, Ghaïlan's troops began to defect, and the tide of the battle turned in Moulay Rashid's favor. Defeated, Ghaïlan fled to Asilah, pursued by Moulay Rashid's men; from there, he set sail for Algiers to join his family, whom he had sent ahead to safety.

The cities of Tétouan, Ksar el-Kebir and Salé swore allegiance to Moulay Rashid. Moulay Rashid remained in western Rif for some time, raising money to pay his men. During this time, using sheikhs from Salé as middlemen, he secretly sent gifts to sheikhs of the Dila'iya Zawiya, thus gaining influential partisans there.

=== Conquest of the Dila'iya Zawiya ===
In 1667, Moulay Rashid turned his attention to the Dilaites, who controlled the Middle Atlas and territories of the western plains from southern Rabat to Azemmour. Their leader, Abdallah ibn Mohammed al-Hajj, saw the threat, and gathered his followers at Dila, where they swore to follow him against Moulay Rashid.

Sometime between late 1666 and early 1667, Moulay Rashid began hostilities with a raid on the Ait Ouallal, a group of Dilaite supporters, in the outskirts of Meknes. Abdallah ibn Mohammed al-Hajj responded by mobilizing his armies, bringing them to camp at Bou Zmora near the Fes River, near Fez. Moulay Rashid met him on the battlefield, and, after three days of fighting, Abdallah ibn Mohammed al-Hajj retreated in defeat.

Between January and August 1667, Moulay Rashid carried out military inspections of Taza, Meknes, and Tétouan. He removed El'aguîd as governor of Meknes, and in Tétouan he arrested Aboùl'abbâs Ahmed Enneqsîs, the head of the city, and a number of members of his party, imprisoning them in Fez. He also appointed Mohammed ben Ahmed El Fassi, faqīh of the Zawiya al-Fassiya, as mufti and governor of Fez. In secret, he continued to correspond with some of Abdallah ibn Mohammed al-Hajj's sheikhs, promising them benevolent rule and good pay if they would side with him in the battle. Meanwhile, Abdallah ibn Mohammed al-Hajj also prepared for war, charging his men to conduct levies, sending some recruits to him at Dila and keeping others in reserve in the mountains. In 1668, both armies set out for war.

Arriving in Dila'iya territory, Moulay Rashid defeated the Berbers in Jebelzebibe, and the survivors joined his army. In Benzeroel, his troops were ambushed in the mountain passes by the soldiers of Moulay Benzeroel, who repeatedly drove them back, inflicting considerable casualties. Moulay Rashid, seeing his troops retreating, said:

"… do you have less virtue than these Berbers? and your fathers did they not subjugate all of Africa and Spain? What? You are so cowardly now that you degenerate from the bravery of those ancient Arabs our ancestors? Well [...] if you don't want to follow me, I'm rather happy to go and live among these people than to be the leader of so many cowardly hearts…"

Having said this, he led a redoubled attack, and succeeded in driving back the Berbers, killing more than four thousand of the fleeing enemy with a cavalry detachment. In victory, Moulay Rashid looted the mountains and compelled heavy contributions from the conquered populace, but accepted the surrender of Moulay Benzeroel graciously, sending him to Fez to be received as an honored guest.

Marching further into the Middle Atlas, Moulay Rashid met Ibn Mohammed al Hajj in the countryside of Fezzaz on June 18, 1668. Before the battle could begin, the traitors among Ibn Mohammed al-Hajj's ranks seized him and brought him as a prisoner to Moulay Rashid. Abdallah Ibn Mohammed al-Hajj's army became divided, with one flank supporting Moulay Rashid and the other remaining loyal, and the battle quickly turned in Moulay Rashid's favor. Victorious, Moulay Rashid spared the lives of the Dilaite troops, and sent Ibn Mohammed al-Hajj to Fez, where he remained until February 1669, when he departed with his family for exile in Tlemcen. Ibn Mohammed al-Hajj's sons, still in the mountains, learned of their father's defeat and fled to Mecca.

Moulay Rashid remained in Dila' for some time, receiving the allegiance of the people of the Middle Atlas. Before leaving, he sent all of the inhabitants of the local zawiya to Fez, and razed the building to the ground.

=== Conquest of Marrakesh ===
On July 31, 1668, Moulay Rashid, returning from his conquest of Dila' and a brief campaign in the Jbel Ayachi, turned his army on Marrakesh. Marrakesh had been ruled by the al-Shabani family since Abdul Karim al-Hajj ben Abu Bakr al-Shabani took control of the kingdom from Ahmad al-Abbas al-Saadi in 1659, although commentators disagree on the legitimacy and effectiveness of their rule. Upon Abdul Karim's murder in 1667, he was succeeded by his son Abu Bakr, who now attempted to resist Moulay Rashid with his band of ill-trained men.

The resistance was brief, as Abu Bakr's men were not loyal to their ruler, and many of them sided with Moulay Rashid. Moulay Rashid took the city of Marrakesh, and Abu Bakr fled to the mountains with a small group of partisans, where he was captured by Moulay Rashid's men. Moulay Rashid had him executed by being dragged behind a mule, alongside a number of his family, as well as exhuming and burning the body of his father Abdul Karim.

Finding the widow and orphans of Ahmad al-Abbas imprisoned in a tower, Moulay Rashid had the eldest daughter, Lalla Mariem, married to his nephew Moulay Ahmed ben Mehrez, and sent the rest to live in Fez. Moulay Rashim named Moulay Ahmed ben Mehrez as Khalifa of Marrakesh, leaving him most of the troops to secure the newly conquered territories, as well as his brother-in-law Abdelaziz A'aras as chief advisor.

Returning to Fez in 1668, Moulay withdrew the duties of mufti of Fez from Mohammed ben Ahmed El Fassi, appointing his half-brother Moulay Ismail as Khalifa. He replaced Elmezouâr with the faqīh Aboû 'Abdallah Mobammed ben Elhasan Elmeggâsi, and appointed the faqīh Aboû 'Abdallah Mobammed Elboû'inâni as preacher of the al-Qarawiyyin Mosque.

In 1670, Moulay Rashid received word that Moulay Ahmed was sick and struggling to control the Chabanate. Leaving Fez in haste, he arrived in Marrakesh in March of that year, and took over from Moulay Ahmed, who had recently succeeded in an offensive against the Chabanate. Moulay Rashid marched on the armies of the Chabanate and invited them to surrender to him, offering them good treatment and pay equal to his own soldiers. They accepted, and their sheikhs swore allegiance to him.

=== Conquest of the Sous ===
The Sous had been ruled by Aboulhasen Ali ben Mohammed Essoussi Essemlali from 1614 until his death in 1660, whereupon he was succeeded by his son Abou Abdallah Mohammed ben Bou Hassoun. It was notoriously difficult territory, both mountainous and well-defended:

"...quantity of castles and villages where the Berbers are fortified. They each have two or three armies there, for a change, on which they base their wealth. The Susis are more skilled in arms and more warlike than all other Berbers."

— Germain Mouette

Nevertheless, with control of Marrakesh and 6000 Chabanate horsemen added to his army, Moulay Rashid resolved to conquer the Sous. He marched on Haha province, where the sheikhs immediately surrendered, meeting him with gifts and oaths of allegiance. Moulay Rashid accepted, increasing his army to a total of 25000 horsemen and 48000 infantrymen, armed with bows and arrows, scimitars, slings, and maces.

Moulay Rashid pushed on towards Agadir, taking the coastal route southward before turning east towards the Anti-Atlas mountains. His army took Taroudant easily, killing 1500 of the Hestouka. In the mountains, the Berbers resisted fiercely, and the battle lasted for many days. Finally, however, a group of Berbers stationed behind the mountain pass sent Moulay Rashid a message, offering to betray their comrades and attack from behind, in order to seize the possessions of the whole army for themselves. The remaining Berbers were caught between assaults from both sides, and their defeat was total. Moulay Rashid did not spare any of the enemy survivors, including the traitors, whom he had executed for perfidy.

As Moulay Rashid approached Agadir with his army, the master of the city fled by night to Illigh. The remaining inhabitants came out to meet Moulay Rashid, carrying a white flag of surrender. Moulay Rashid accepted their allegiance, and installed a garrison of his troops in Agadir before marching on to Illigh. Illigh was well-fortified, but the population was too great for the city to endure a siege for long, and the sheikh soon fled by night with his family to Bambara Segu. At the same time, Moulay Rashid's army penetrated the walls of the city, and the inhabitants, finding their sheikh absent, surrendered to Moulay Rashid.

== Death ==
Moulay died in Marrakesh on April 9, 1672, at the age of 42, after a fall from his horse. He was succeeded by his half-brother Moulay Ismail, who had served as his first lieutenant, his regent during his 1669 southern campaign, and Khalifa of Meknes since 1666.

== Policies ==
=== Public works and policies ===
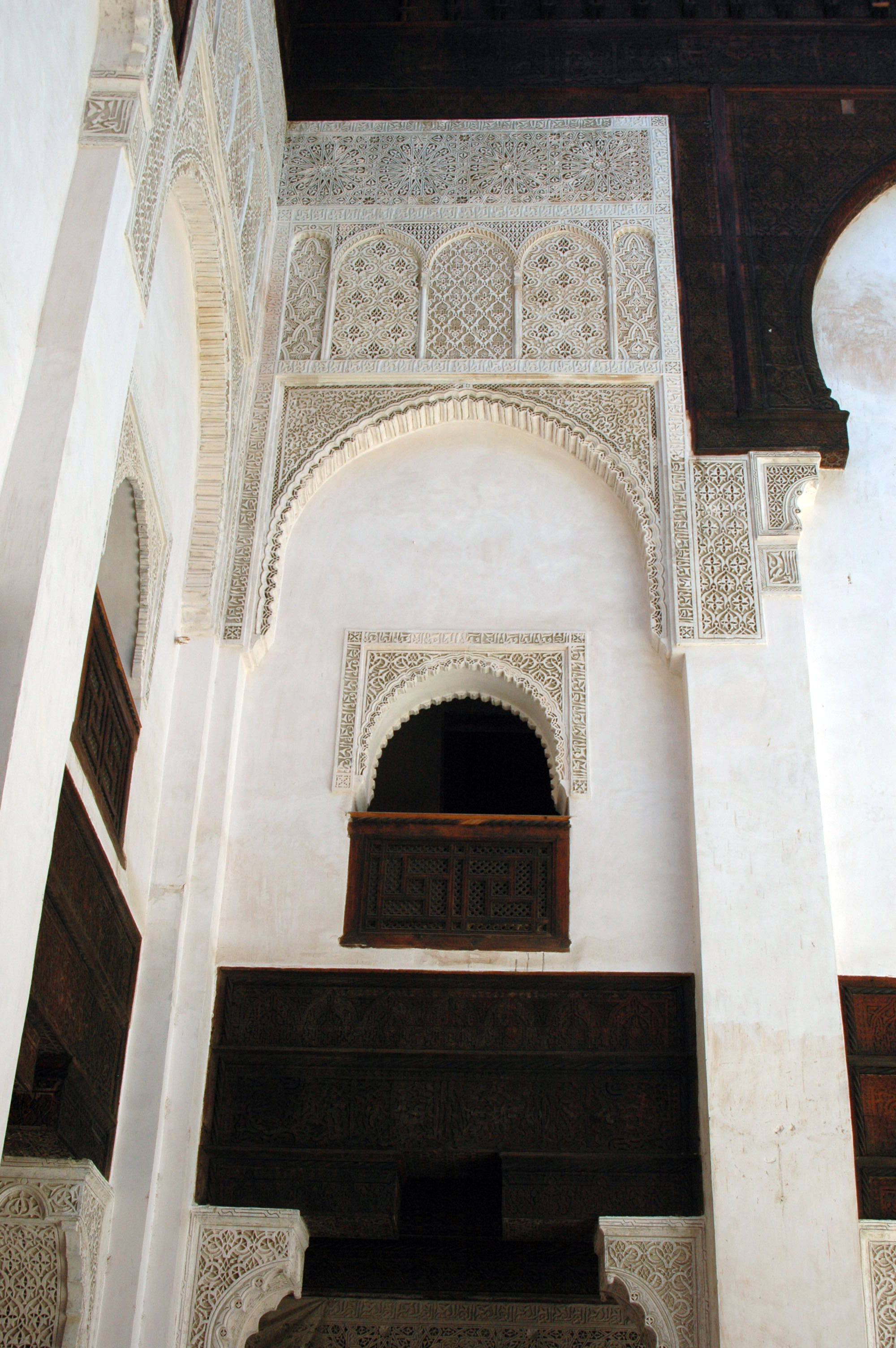
Cherratine Madrasa, the first Koranic school founded by the 'Alawis in the city of Fez.

During his reign, Moulay Rashid oversaw the construction of various public infrastructure. This included the eight-arched Oued Sebou Bridge in 1670 and Fez's Errecîf bridge in 1671. The wells he built in Echcott in the Sahara are called Abar Essultan (the sultan's wells) in his memory, and supply water to caravans making the Hajj.

Moulay Rashid used much of the profit from his campaign in the Sous on improvements to his capital. He added a library to the southern face of the Qarawiyyin Mosque, and ordered the construction of the Cherratine Madrasa, as well as building himself a new palace in Fes Jdid.

Other works ordered by Moulay Rashid included the Kasbah in El Jadida, the Kasbah Cherarda in Fez, and a madrasa in Marrakesh next to the mosque of Sheikh Abu 'Abdallâh Mohammed bin Salal.

=== Economic reforms ===
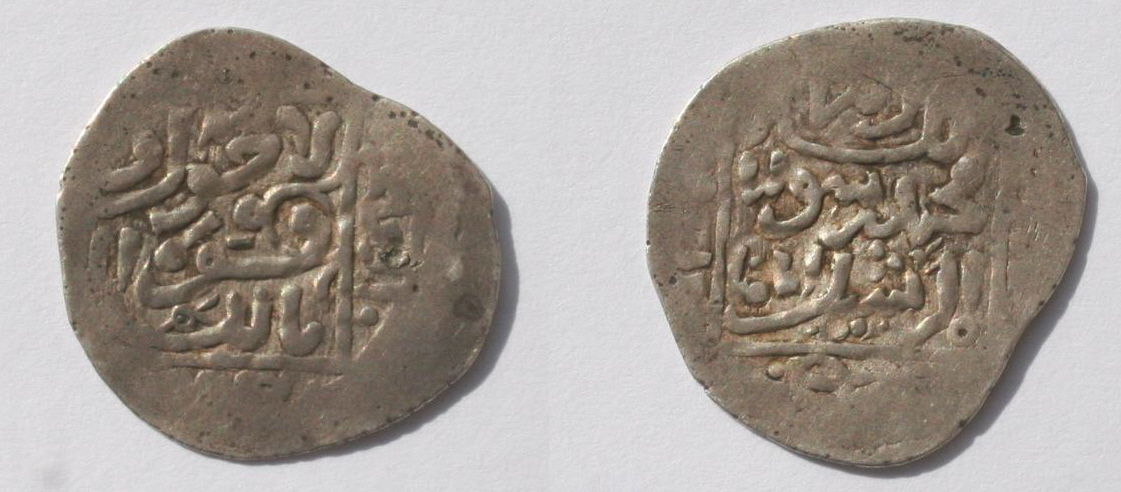
Silver coins (mouzoûna) minted during the reign of Moulay Rashid between 1670 and 1671.

In May 1669, Moulay Rashid minted the Rechîdiya currency. Through a one-year loan of 1052 mithqal to the merchants of Fez, he effectively ended the currency shortage of the preceding decade.

In October 1670, Moulay Rashid minted round copper floûs, replacing the square Elouchqoubiya previously in circulation. The sultan decided that henceforth there would be 24 of these floûs for a mouzoûna, instead of 48.

== Personal life ==
=== Family ===
Sultan Moulay Rashid married two wives, both in 1666: a daughter of Sheikh Al-Lawati of the Beni Snassen, and a daughter of Abdallah A'aras. He had two sons and an unknown number of daughters from his marriages; there is no record of which of his wives bore the children.

In addition, he had a harem of slave concubines. His favorite among these was a Spanish captive, whom he lodged in the most richly decorated apartments of the harem. Another of his slave concubines was Lalla Aisha Mubarka.

Upon Moulay Rashid's death in April 1672, he was succeeded by his brother Moulay Ismail, as his sons were infants and therefore ineligible to inherit according to 'Alawi custom. The new sultan married Moulay Rashid's widowed first wife, and became the guardian of his young sons until 1680, when he sent them along with his own eldest son to live in Tafilalt.

=== Personality ===
Young Moulay Rashid was described as a proud and ambitious man. Moroccan historians portray him as wise and politically astute.

Moulay Rashid was known for his respect for scholars, honoring them, seeking their company, and supporting them generously. As a result, science flourished under his reign. According to one story, he once sent for a scholar, who refused, quoting the saying of Imam Mālik: "One comes to science, she does not come to you." From then on, Moulay Rashid went to the scholar's house to study.

According to al-Qadiri's Nachr Elmatsani (The Chronicles), Moulay Rashid assisted at the lessons of Sheikh al-Yusi at the University of al-Qarawiyyin.

== See also ==
- List of Kings of Morocco
- History of Morocco

Preceded by Ahmad al Abbas	Sultan of Morocco; 1666–1672	Succeeded by Moulay Ismail
