= Hassan I of Morocco =

Sultan of Morocco from 1873 to 1894

Hassan bin Mohammed الحسن بن محمد
- Amir al-Mu'minin
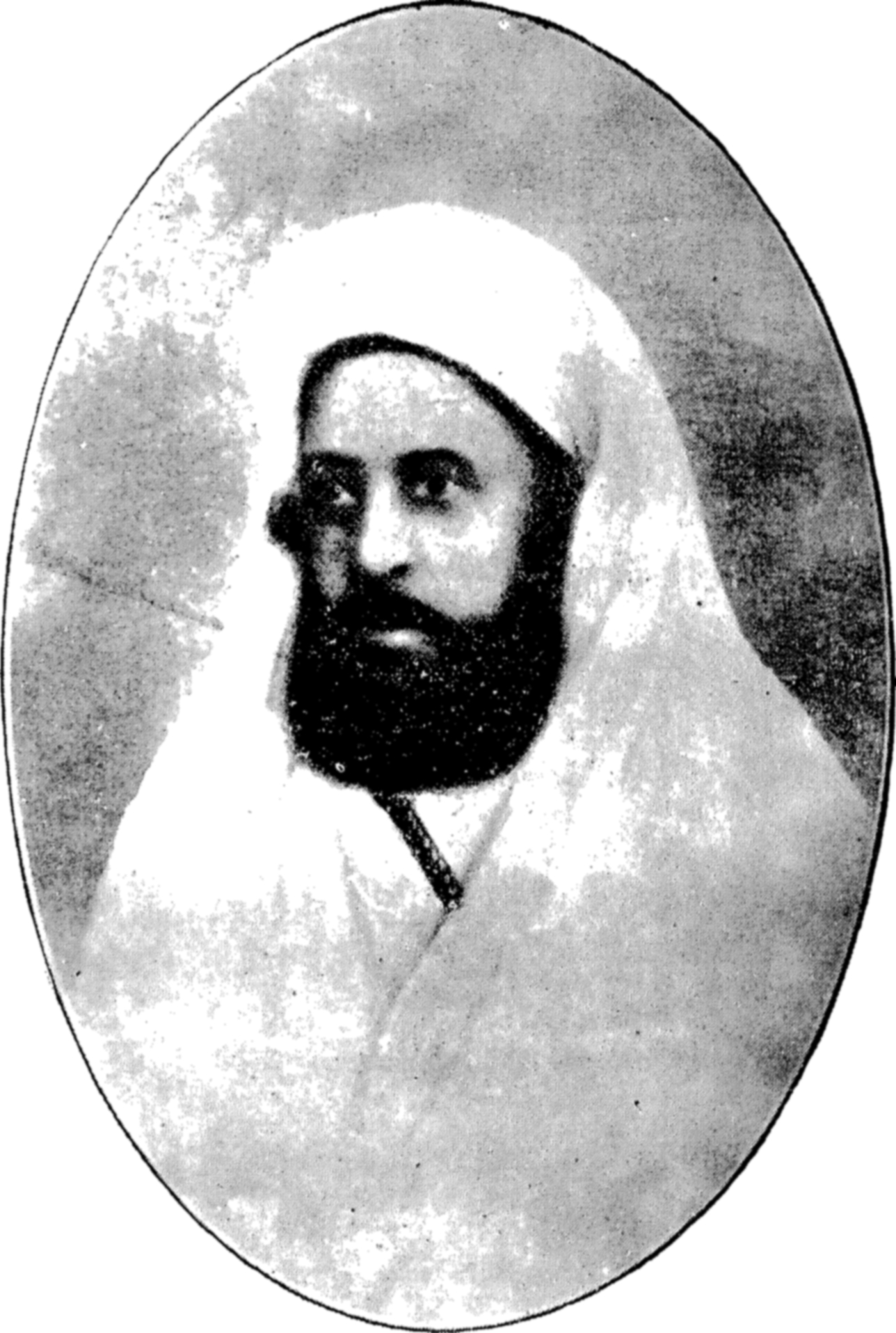
- Mawlay Hassan I in 1873

Sultan of Morocco
- Reign: 1873–1894
- Coronation: 25 September 1873
- Predecessor: Sidi Muhammad IV
- Successor: Mawlay Abd al-Aziz
- Born: 1836 or 1857; Fez, Morocco
- Died: 9 June 1894; Tadla, Morocco
- Burial: Dar al-Makhzen, Rabat, Morocco
- Wives: among others: Princess Lalla Zaynab bint Abbas; Lalla Aliya al-Settatiya (before 1876); Lalla Khadija bint al-Arbi; Lalla Zohra bint al-Hajj Maathi; Lalla Ruqaya
- Issue: 27 children, including: Mohammed bin Hassan; Fatima Zahra bint Hassan; Abd al-Hafid bin Hassan; Abd al-Aziz bin Hassan; Yusef bin Hassan
Names
- Abū ʿAlī al-Ḥasan ibn Muḥammad; Arabic: أبو علي الحسن الأول بن محمد
- House: 'Alawi dynasty
- Father: Muhammad bin Abd al-Rahman
- Religion: Maliki (Sunni Islam)

Mawlay Hassan bin Mohammed (Arabic: الحسن بن محمد, romanized: al-Ḥasan bin Muḥammad), known as Hassan I (Arabic: الحسن الأول, romanized: al-Ḥasan al-Awwal; 1836 – 9 June 1894) was the sultan of Morocco from 16 September 1873 to 9 June 1894, as a ruler of the 'Alawi dynasty. He was proclaimed sultan after the death of his father Muhammad IV. Mawlay Hassan was among the most successful sultans. He increased the power of the makhzen in Morocco and at a time when the rest of Africa was falling under foreign control, he brought in military and administrative reforms to strengthen his government within its complete territory, and he carried out an active military and diplomatic program on the periphery. He died on 9 June 1894 and was succeeded by his son Abd al-Aziz.

== Early life ==
Hassan bin Mohammed was born in 1857 or 1836 to Mawlay Muhammad IV whom he was the favourite son of. At an early age, he was educated in the subtleties of court politics.

== Reign ==
=== Early reign and rebellion in Fez ===
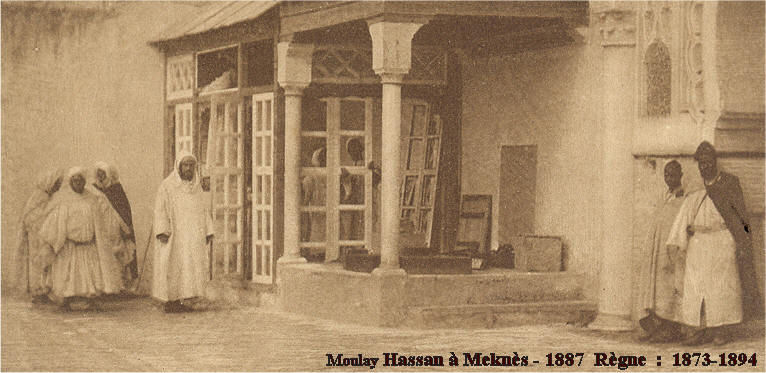
Hassan I in Meknes.

Mawlay Hassan was proclaimed sultan of Morocco on the death of his father in 1873. His first action was to crush an urban revolt in the capital Fez in 1874, which he had to besiege for a few months. The tanners rose up in protest "raging like lions and tigers" through the streets of Fez, pillaging the house of Muhammad Bennis, the Minister of Finance, turning Fez into a battleground. Hassan I, who was on campaign sent letters calling for the pacification of the city. Shortly after, the hated tax collectors were withdrawn, and the rebellion halted. The tax collectors soon reappeared, leading to the rebellion commencing again more violently. The local Fez militiamen took up positions in minarets of Fes el Bali and fired down on the army, but the two sides later negotiated peace and the rebellion was definitely terminated. Of strong Arab culture, he did not know any foreign language, although Hassan I was a conservative ruler, he realised the need for modernization and the reform policy of his father.

He strived to maintain the cohesion of his kingdom through political, military, and religious action, in the face of European threats on its periphery, and internal rebellions, He initiated reforms. He strived to ensure the loyalty of the great chiefs of the south. He did not hesitate to appoint local qaids like Sheikh Ma al-'Aynayn who gave him the Bay'a, the pledge of allegiance in Islamic law. He tried to modernize his army, and lead several expeditions to assert his authority, such as to the Sous in 1882 and 1886, to the Rif in 1887, and to Tafilalt in 1893.

=== Relations with Europe ===
Sultan Hassan I managed to maintain the independence of Morocco while neighbouring states fell under European influence, such as Tunis which was conquered by France in 1881 and Egypt which was occupied by Britain in 1882.

Both Spain and France hoped for a weak Makhzen government of Morocco, while the British hoped for the opposite, a reformed Moroccan state which could stand on its own. Aware of this, Hassan called for an international conference on the issue, and the Treaty of Madrid was signed on 3 July 1880 to limit the practice, an important event of Hassan's reign. Instead of reducing foreign interference, the Makhzen had to grant concessions such as granting foreigners rights to own land in the countryside, something which Great Britain was pushing for all along. This was followed by French incursions into the region of Touat in the south, which was considered Moroccan territory. This treaty effectively gave international approval and protection for lands which had been captured by foreign powers. This set the stage for the French protectorate in Morocco beginning in 1912.

In 1879 and again in 1880, the British Legation in Morocco was informed by Moroccan authorities that the domains of the Hassan reached as far as the Senegal River and included the town of Timbuktu and neighboring portions of Sudan, a claim based on the fact that the predecessors of Hassan had always considered themselves as sovereigns of these regions. Since 1879, the British occupied Tarfaya and built a fortification there in 1882 known as Port Victoria. It was not until 1886 that the sultan sent a military expedition there, damaging the fort and forcing Donald MacKenzie to leave. The sultan's expedition to Sus in 1886 was followed a year later by the Spanish occupation of Dakhla on the Saharan coast. Hassan responded by appointing a khalifa (governor) over the Sahara, Ma al-'Aynayn. In 1888 Timbuktu requested that Hassan send a governor to help the town against the French forces advancing into the Niger basin.

=== Military reform ===
Hassan I continued to expand the military reforms started by his father Muhammad IV. The new and reformed 'Askar al-Nizami introduced by sultan Abd al-Rahman in 1845 after the Battle of Isly was expanded by Hassan I to the size of 25,000 men and 1,000 artillery. The sultan also enhanced the Moroccan coastal defences with batteries of large caliber cannon, and in 1888 built an arms factory in Fez known as Dar al-Makina, however production in it was little and costly. To train the reformed Moroccan army, Hassan I sent students to London, but in 1876, the sultan hired Harry MacLean, a British officer based in Gibraltar, who designed a military uniform in Arab-style, and learned to speak excellent Arabic.

Every year from spring to fall, Hassan I was on campaign, and lead expeditions to all parts of the kingdom. One of Hassan's campaigns was dealing with the Darqawa uprising near Figuig in the fall of 1887, which was quickly suppressed. Particularly well known is the journey Hassan I undertook in 1893. He went from Fez (leaving on 29 June) to Marrakesh, passing through the Tafilalt place where his dynasty came from, the sand dunes of Erg Chebbi, the valley of the Dadès with the majestic gorges of the Todra, Warzazat, the Kasbah of Aït Benhaddou, the high passage along Telouet, the Tichka pass (2260 m) in the high Atlas, Guelmim port of the Western Sahara. The voyage took six months and succeeded in its objective of reuniting and pacifying the tribes of several regions. The Krupp cannon he gave on this occasion to the qaid of Telouet (member of the now famous Glaoua family) is still on display in the center of Warzazat. In 1881 he founded Tiznit.

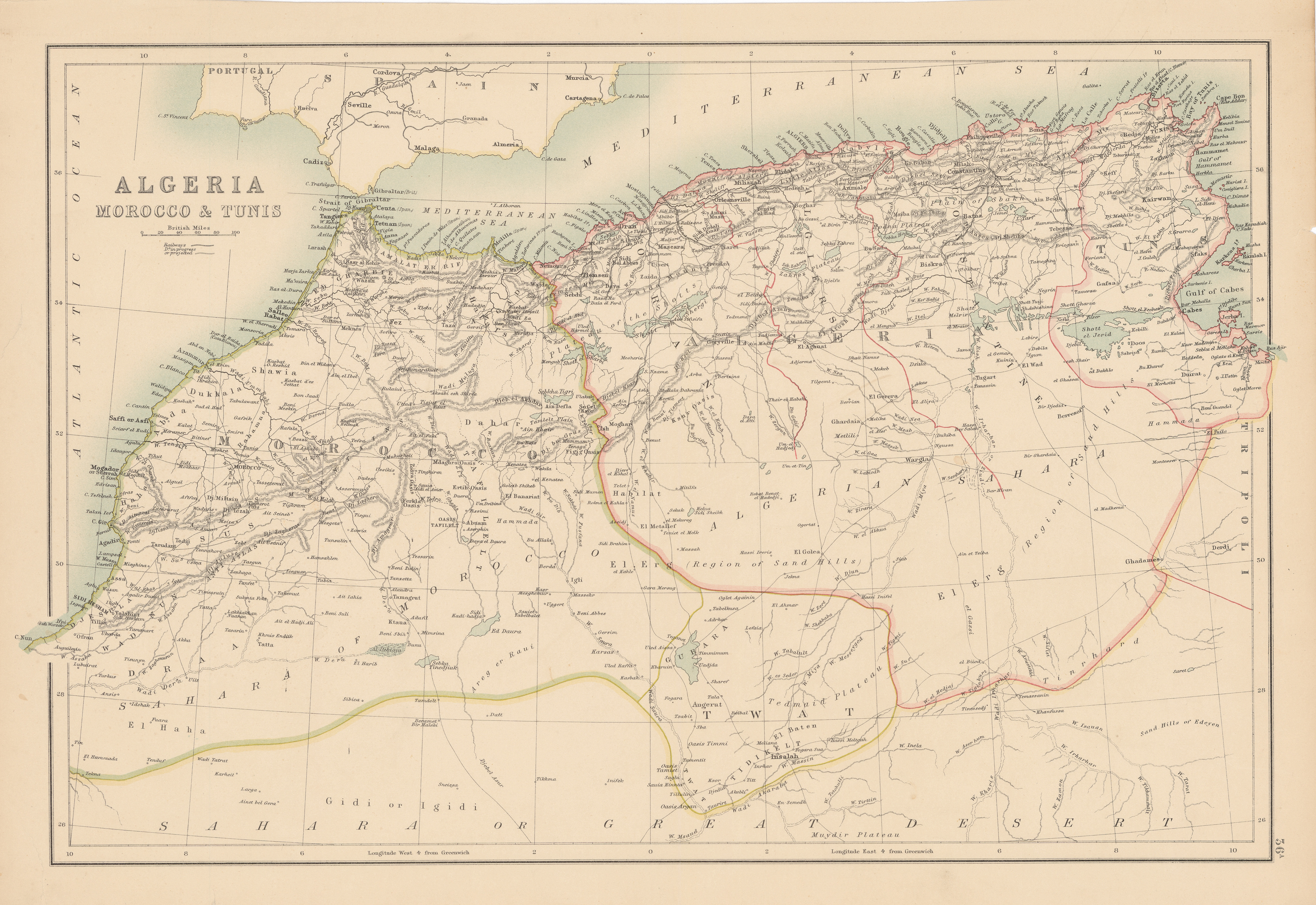
Map of Morocco during the reign of Hassan I alongside French Algeria to the east.

Hassan I appointed Mouha Zayani as qaid of the Zayanes in Khenifra in 1877. Mouha Zayani was to be an important figure in the 20th century colonial war against France. In 1887 he appointed sheikh Ma al-'Aynayn as his qaid in Western Sahara. Ma al-'Aynayn too played an important role in the struggle for independence of Morocco.

Hassan decided to reinstate the old Moroccan administration in the Gourara-Touat-Tidikelt. The first Moroccan envoys reached the Saharan oases in 1889 and in 1890. In 1891 Hassan called on the oases peoples to begin paying taxes, thus formalizing the recognition of his suzerainty. That same year the Touat and the oases which lay along the Oued Saoura were placed under the authority of the son of the Moroccan khalifa who resided in the Tafilalt. Then, in 1892, a complete administrative organization was established in all of the Gourara-Touat-Tidikelt. The Moroccan Government even went so far as to extend to the qaids of the Touareg of the Ahenet and the Hoggar a formal recognition that they were dependent subjects of the Sultan. In 1892 and 1893, the Moroccans further solidified their control in the Guir-Zouzfana basin and along the oued Saoura by investing with official authority the qaids from all of the nomadic and sedentary tribes of the region (this included the Doui Menia and Oulad Djerir tribes, the most important nomads of the Guir-Zousfana basin; the oasis of Igli; and the sedentary Beni Goumi people who lived along the banks of the Oued Zouzfana).

== Death and legacy ==
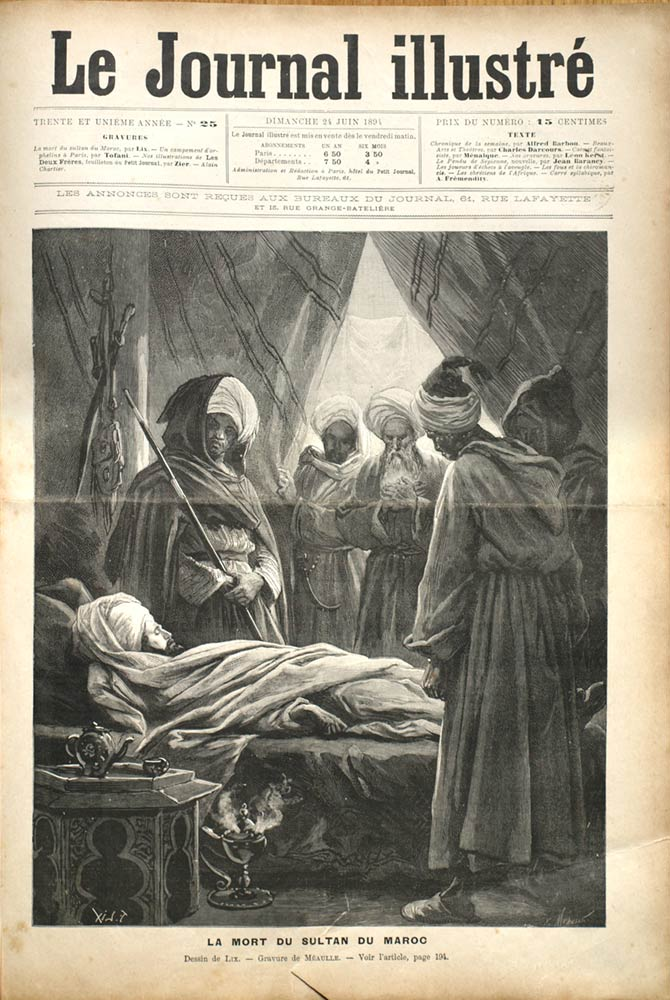
The death of Hassan I, as imagined by an the engraver Fortuné Méaulle, on the cover of Le Journal illustré.

On 9 June 1894, Hassan I died from illness near Wadi al-Ubayd in the region of Tadla. Since the army was still in enemy territory, his chamberlain and Grand Wazir Ahmad bin Musa kept the death a secret, ordering the ministers to not reveal the news. The sultan's body was taken to Rabat and buried there, in a qubba next to Dar al-Makhzen which also contains the tomb of his ancestor Sidi Mohammed III. Hassan was succeeded by his son Abd al-Aziz, thirteen years old at the time, and ruled under the regency of his father's former Grand Wazir, Ahmad bin Musa, until his death from heart failure in 1900.

=== Legacy ===
French colonisers during the protectorate of Morocco like Hubert Lyautey, who believed in preserving the institutions of the pre-colonial Makhzen and the prestige of the 'Alawi dynasty, saw Hassan as the idealised blueprint of the traditional Makhzen. He has also been described as the "last great sultan" of Morocco before colonialism.

== Personality and personal life ==
=== Appearance and personality ===
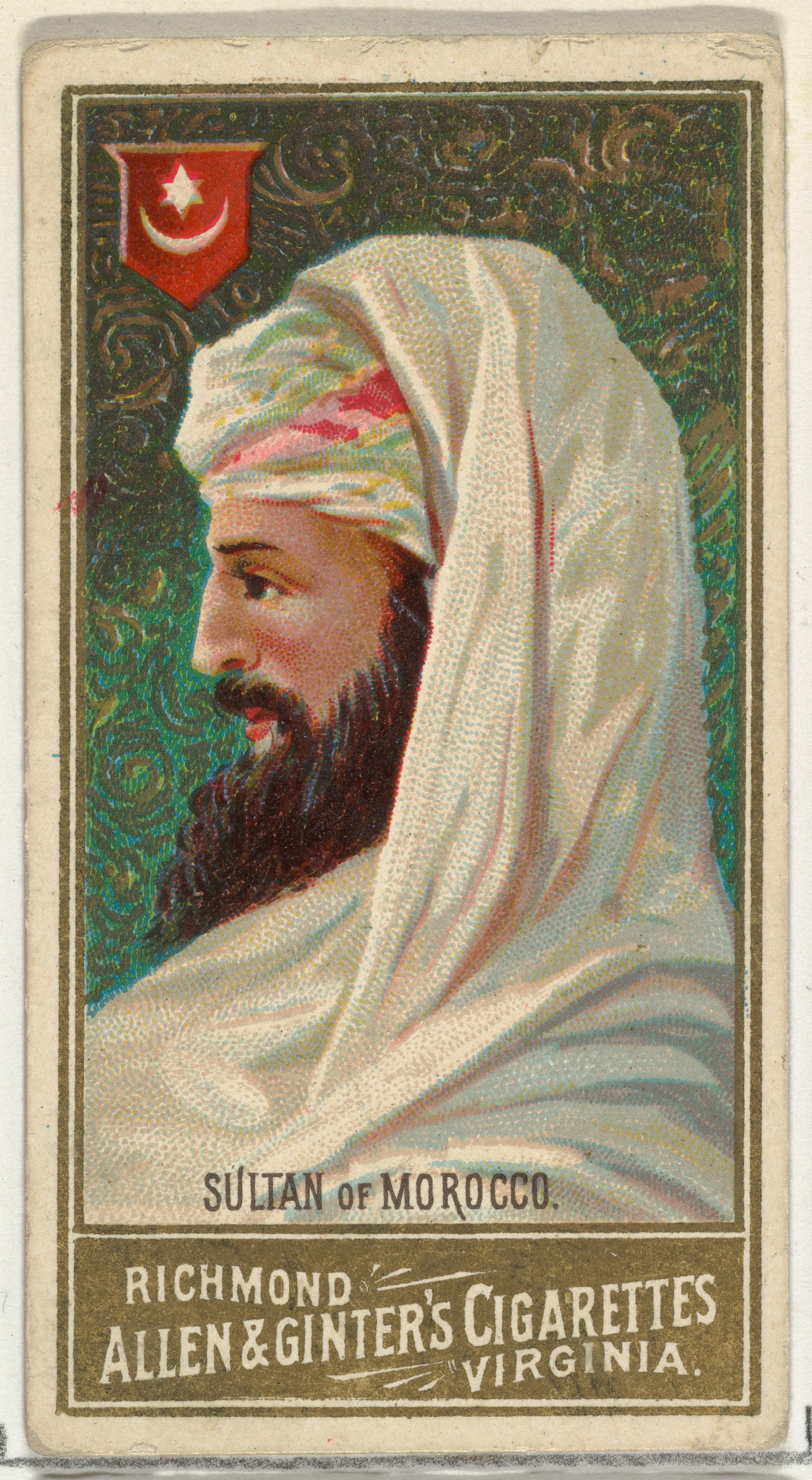
1889 depiction of Hassan from World's Sovereigns series (N34) for Allen & Ginter Cigarettes

Italian traveller Edmondo De Amicis gave a description of Hassan I:

This Sultan ... was the handsomest, most attractive young man who ever won an odalisque’s heart. He was tall, active, with large, soft eyes, a ﬁne aquiline nose, dark, oval face, and a short, black beard. His expression was at once noble and melancholy. A white haïk [cloak] enveloped him from head to foot . . . the large and entirely white horse he rode had green housings, and the stirrups were of gold. All this whiteness and the long, full cloak lent him something of a sacerdotal air. ... His graceful bearing, his expression, half-melancholy, half-smiling; his subdued, even voice, sounding like the murmur of a brook; in short his entire appearance and manner had a something [ sic ] ingenuous and feminine, and yet, at the same time, a solemnity that aroused instinctive admiration as well as profound respect.

— Morocco, Its People and Places

=== Family and personal life ===
Hassan I married eight times and had a harem of concubines. His descendants, beginning with his wives, were as follows:

Princess Lalla Zaynab bint Abbas whom he married in 1875. Together they had:

- Sidi Mohammed the eldest son of Moulay Hassan I, he was his father's heir until his rebellion, when he was evicted;
- Moulay Zain al-Abdine.

Lalla Aliya al-Settatiya, Together they had:

- Sultan Moulay Abd al-Hafid.

Lalla Khadija bint al-Arbi, together they had:

- Moulay Abderrahmane;
- Moulay al-Kabir.

Lalla Zohra bint al-Hajj Maathi, together they had:

- Moulay Bil-Ghayth;
- Moulay Abou Bakar.

Lalla Ruqaya. Originally, a Circassian slave concubine purchased from Hajj Lʿarbi al-Humaydi Bricha alongside another Circassian concubine, Amina. She became Hassan's favorite wife towards the end of his life and held political influence after his death. Their children are:

- Lalla Oum Kelthoum;
- Lalla Nezha;
- Sultan Moulay Abdelaziz;
- Lalla Chérifa;
- Moulay Abdelkébir.

Lalla Kinza al-Daouia: she divorced from the sultan and remarried to Abdallah al-Daouia then to Mohammed el-Talba. From her marriage to the sultan, she had:

- Moulay al-Mamun, he is the father of Princess Lalla Hanila bint Mamoun;
- Moulay al-Amin;
- Moulay Othman;
- Moulay Mohammed al-Anwar.

Lalla Oum al-Khair, her last name is not retained; together, they had:

- Moulay Abdallah, he died on December 15, 1883;
- Moulay Jaafar;
- Sidi Mohammed el Sghir;
- Moulay Talib;

Lalla Oum Zayda, her last name is not retained; together, they had:

- Moulay Mohammed al-Mehdi;
- another son named Abdallah;
- Lalla Abla.

Sultan Moulay Hassan I is also the father of:

- Princess Lalla Fatima Zahra (died in 1894), a woman of letters and faqīha who donated a large part of her princely literary collection for the library of the University of al-Qarawiyyin in Fez.

Moulay Hassan I had a harem of slave concubines (jawari), but the precise number of his slave concubines is largely unknown, leaving room for speculation.

Aisha (Ayesha): she was a slave concubine of Georgian origin. Purchased in Istanbul in 1876 by the vizier Sidi Gharnat, she was the favorite of Sultan Moulay Hassan I during the sixteen years she remained in his harem.

Amina was a Circassian concubine bought alongside Lalla Ruqayya from Hajj Lʿarbi al-Humaydi Bricha. She was the mother of Yusef of Morocco

Suchet adds a "batch" of four other Circassian women of great beauty and accomplished talents purchased for 100,000 francs in 1878 in Cairo and another three other Circassian slave concubines, without further details.

== See also ==
- List of sultans of Morocco
- History of Morocco
- Hassan I Dam
- Hassan I Airport

== Sources ==
- Miller, Susan Gilson (2013-04-15). A History of Modern Morocco. Cambridge University Press. ISBN 978-0-521-81070-8.

Preceded by Muhammad IV	Sultan of Morocco; 1873–1894	Succeeded by Abd al-Aziz
