= Al-Hassan Ad-Dakhil =

al-Hassan al-Dakhil الحسن الداخل

Imam of Tafilalt

Personal details
- Born: Yanbu, Hejaz
- Died: Tafilalt, Morocco
- House: 'Alawi dynasty

al-Hassan al-Dakhil (Arabic: الحسن الداخل, for "the one who entered") was the grandfather of Sharif ibn Ali the founder of the 'Alawid dynasty, which is the current Moroccan royal family. It is commonly believed that he was taken to Morocco from the town of Yanbu in the Hejaz at the end of the 13th century by the inhabitants of Tafilalt to be their Imam at the behest of Abu Ibrahim Al Omari. They were hoping that, as he was a descendant of Muhammad, his presence would help to improve their date palm crops thanks to his barakah (an Islamic term meaning a sense of divine presence or charisma).

Preceded by Office established	Imam of Tafilalt	Succeeded by Muhammad ibn al-Hassan
