= Lalla Ruqaya =

Princess consort of Morocco
- Died: 1902
- Spouse: Hassan I of Morocco
- Issue: Lalla Oum Kelthoum; Lalla Nezha; Sultan Moulay Abdelaziz; Lalla Sharifa; Moulay Abdulkabir
- Dynasty: Alawi dynasty (by marriage)
- Religion: Sunni Islam

Lalla Ruqaya (Arabic: للا رقية; died 1902) was one of the wives of Sultan Hassan I and the mother of Sultan Moulay Abdelaziz.

== Under Hassan ==
Lalla Ruqaya was a Circassian concubine given to Hassan I by the merchant Hajj Lʿarbi al-Humaydi Bricha. Bricha was a notable slave trader who provided slaves both to the Tetouani elite and the sultan's court. Slave women from the Ottoman Empire were valued, especially Circassian women. Ruqaya was sold or given to Hassan in 1878 along with Amina who became the mother of Yusuf.

Lalla Ruqaya is described as a faqīha and a scholar. She was a woman who had acquired very advanced knowledge in Quranic studies.

Her son Moulay Abdelaziz was educated in the house of Sidi Mohammed al-Amrani, one of the main sharifs of the Alaouite court. With the latter her son Moulay Abdelaziz had received his education in accordance with the tradition of the dynasty. After the disgrace of his elder brother Sidi Mohammed, Sultan Moulay Hassan I hastened to name him official heir to the crown. She became the favorite wife of Moulay Hassan I during the last years of his reign.

== Under Abd al-Aziz ==
Upon the ascension to the throne of her minor son, she was not granted the position of regent, Alawite traditions exclude women from this position. The regency was attributed to the vizier Ba Ahmed. Her position was limited to remaining one of her son's main advisors, a position she maintained until after he reached 21 years-old, according to contemporary sources. There was real intimacy between mother and son, as they dined together even as adults. Lalla Ruqaya was a woman with open political ideas for her time, she advised her son to bring the kingdom's mode of governance closer to that of the West.

Ba Ahmed died in 1901. Moulay Abdelaziz was still subject to the influence of his mother for a time; she made him take as grand vizier al-Hadj al-Mokhtar ben Ahmed, first secretary of the deceased grand vizier. He also chose as minister of war a former mokhzani of Si Ahmed, Si Mehdi al-Menehbi. Thus, the policy of the old Makhzen still continued, but the hands which wielded it no longer had the same vigor. The sultan grew and showed himself impatient with any tutelage, threatening to ruin the rotten edifice of the Moroccan government. Soon Moulay Abdelaziz only listened to his impulses; he rejected his mother's advice. In April 1901, tired of the observations of al-Hadj al-Mokhtar, he dismissed his grand vizier.

Lalla Ruqaya died in 1902.

== Descendance ==
Lalla Ruqaya and Moulay Hassan I's children were:

1. Lalla Oum Kelthoum;
2. Lalla Nezha;
3. Sultan Moulay Abdelaziz (February 24, 1881 – June 10, 1943);
4. Lalla Sharifa;
5. Moulay Abdulkabir, he had a military career in the imperial armed forces in the service of his full-brother.
