= Medersa Loukach =

- مدرسة لوقاش
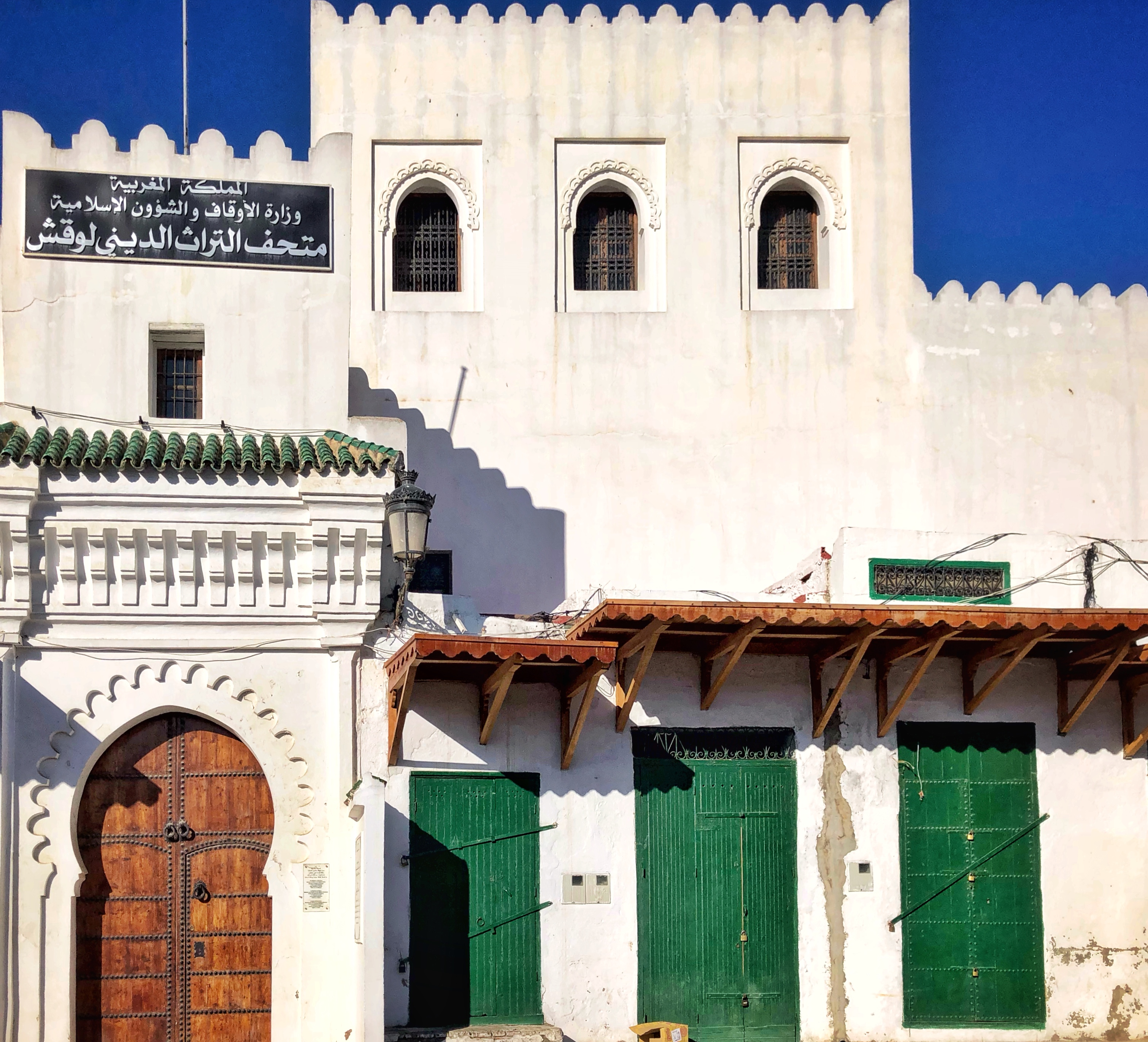
- 35.34°N 5.22°W
- Location: Tetouan, Morocco

Medersa Loukach is a Madrasa built in 1758 in the Medina of Tetouan, Morocco.

It was built in 1758 on the order of the Alaouite Sultan Mohammed ben Abdallah to serve as a school and residence for students who came from surrounding regions to study theology in Tetouan.

Closed in the 1980s, the Madrasa has been rehabilitated and transformed into a museum for the religious heritage and traditional education. The museum was inaugurated by King Mohamed VI in 2011.
