= Lalla Fatima Zahra bint Hassan =

Lalla Fatima Zahra فاطمة الزهراء
- Died: 1894
- House: Alaouite dynasty
- Father: Hassan I of Morocco
- Religion: Islam

Lalla Fatima Zohra (died in 1894) was an Alawi Princess who went down in history as a learned woman. She was the daughter of Moulay Hassan I, Sultan of Morocco (1836–1894).

== Biography ==
Princess Lalla Fatima Zahra was the daughter of Sultan Moulay Hassan I, the identity of her mother was not preserved. The princess was a woman of letters and faqīha who donated a large part of her princely literary collection for the benefit of the library of the University of al-Qarawiyyin in Fes. Her collection contained 273 volumes.

She charitably endowed (waqf) her literary collection to the hizana of al-Qarawiyyin. Among the books was kitab ihtisar al-nihaya wa l'Tamam fi ma'rifat al-wathaiq wa al-ahkam li Ibn Harun (Summary of the end and completion of knowledge of documents and rulings by Ibn Harun), by Ali Ibn Abdullah al-Matety.
