= Ba Ahmed =

Moroccan politician (1841–1900)

Aḥmad bin Mūsa al-Bukhārī أحمد بن موسى البخاري

Grand Wazir of Morocco
- In office 1894–1900
- Monarch: Mawlay Abd al-Aziz
- Preceded by: al-Ma'ti al-Jama'i
- Succeeded by: Mukhtar bin Abdallah

Chamberlain of the Sultan
- In office 1879–1900
- Monarch: Mawlay Hassan I
- Preceded by: Musa bin Ahmed

Personal details
- Born: 1841-2 Marrakesh, Morocco
- Died: 17 May 1900 Marrakesh, Morocco
- Cause of death: Heart failure
- Parent: Musa bin Ahmed
- Religion: Sunni Islam
- Nickname: Ba Ahmed

Aḥmad bin Mūsa bin Aḥmad al-Bukhārī (Arabic: أحمد بن موسى بن أحمد البخاري), known as Bā Aḥmad (Arabic: با أحمد) or Bā Ḥmād (با حماد), was as-sadr al-a'atham (Grand Wazir) of Morocco and de facto ruler of the kingdom between 1894 and 1900. He became the country's true regent, after enthroning the son of Hassan I, Abd al-Aziz, as sultan, who was a child at the time, despite there being older siblings. He favoured Abd al-Aziz as he was responsible for his education. He died on 17 May 1900 and was buried in the royal mausoleum of Moulay Ali al-Sharif. His death meant that a young Abd al-Aziz could have more power leading to his lavish spending widening the trade deficit.

His grandfather was born as a black slave belonging to Moulay Slimane but he became his hajib. Similarly, Ba Ahmed's father became the hajib of Muhammad IV then grand vizier under Hassan I. He had a miserable reputation but was very wealthy. He began the construction of the Bahia Palace. He had several children including Ba Ahmed.

Ba Ahmed first became hajib to Moulay Ismail who was the khalifa in Fez of his brother Hassan I then hajib of Hassan I. He became grand wizier when Abd al-Aziz inherited at the age of 14 and leaving him to his childish pleasures, Ba Ahmed was able to exercise real power in the state and prevented Morocco from falling into anarchy.

He was responsible for expanding the Bahia Palace begun by his father. He had everything built on the ground floor because he was "short and fat". He enlarged the Bahia on the site of some 60 houses and purchased 16 gardens to form its parkland. He also constructed in Marrakesh the reservoir of the Agdal which bears his name along with other public works in the towns.

Preceded by al-Ma'ti al-Jama'i	Grand Wazir of Morocco; 1894–1900	Succeeded by Mukhtar bin Abdallah
