= Ziz River =

River in the south of Morocco and Algeria

Coordinates: 32°28′43″N 4°46′10″W

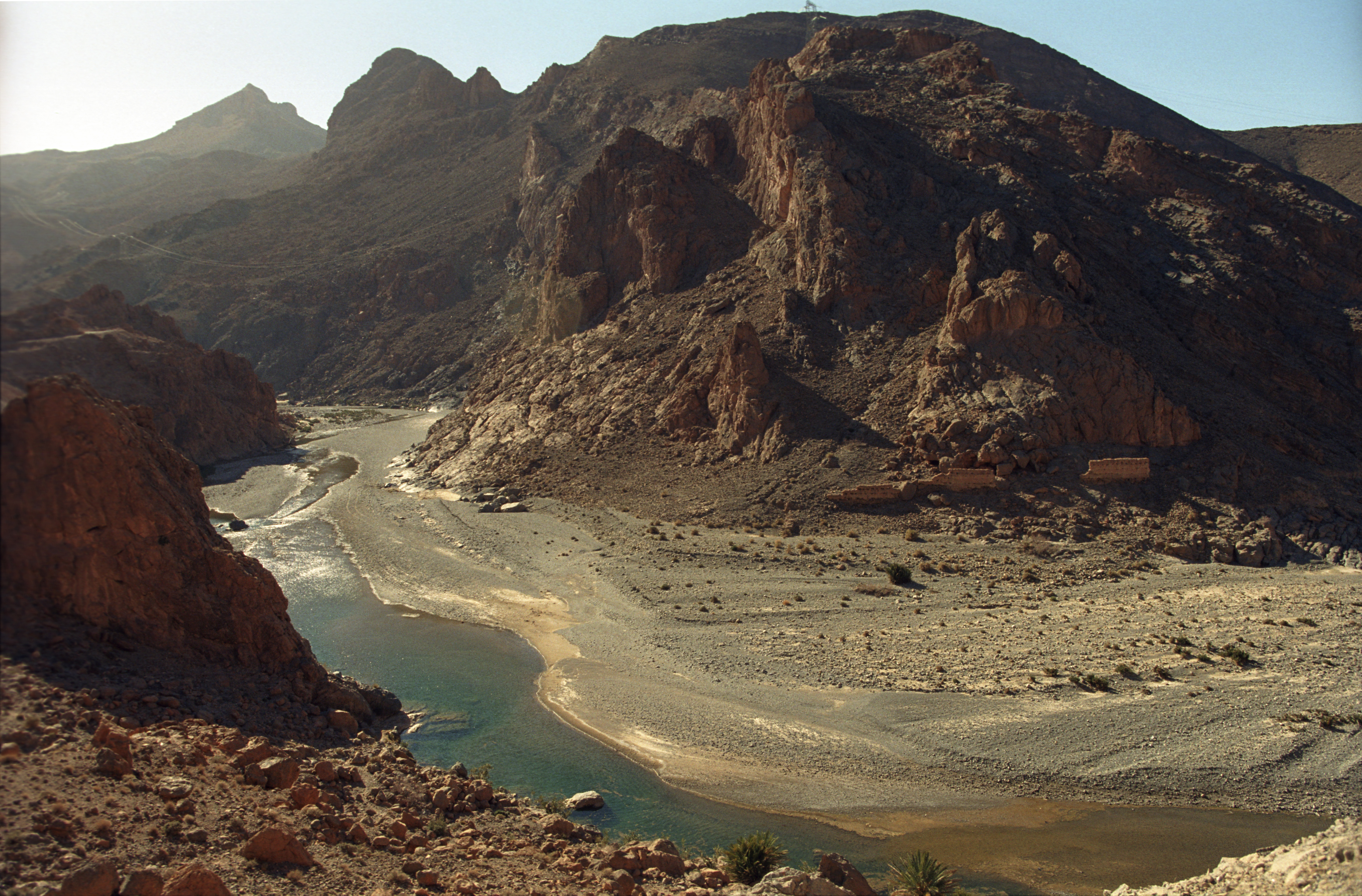

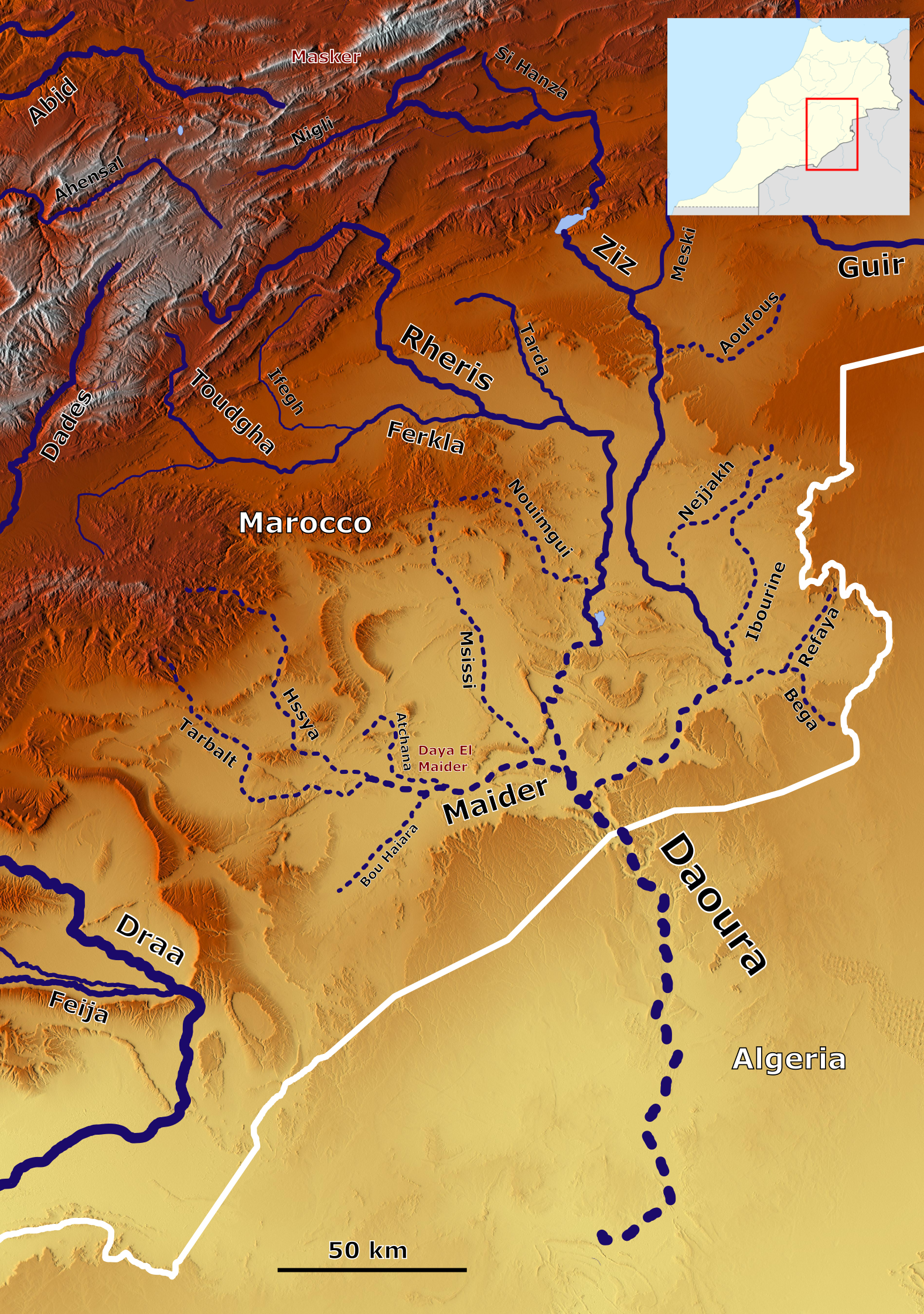
- The Ziz in the Daoura river system (top and center right)
- Native name: وادي زيز (Arabic); ⴰⵙⵉⴼ ⵏ ⵣⵉⵣ (Standard Moroccan Tamazight)

Location
- Country: Morocco, Algeria

Physical characteristics
- Mouth
  - location: Algerian Desert
- Length: 282km (175.2 mi)
- Discharge
  - location: F. Zaabal Station; 1990-1991
  - minimum: 0 m³/sec
  - maximum: 3,100 m³/sec (109,475 cu ft/s)

The Ziz River (Arabic: وادي زيز wadī zīz; Standard Moroccan Tamazight: ⴰⵙⵉⴼ ⵏ ⵣⵉⵣ, romanized: asif n ziz) is a river in the south of Morocco and Algeria. It has its source in the High Atlas mountains of Morocco and flows 282 kilometers (175 mi) into the Tafilalt and Bechar regions.

Cities along the Ziz river include Errachidia, Erfoud and Sijilmassa. There is a dam (Hassan Ad Dakhil dam) on the Ziz river near Errachidia that supplies drinking and irrigation water for the valley, supported by multiple downstream diversion dams for agricultural use.

== Water rights ==
Along the Ziz there is typically a common water rights rule, wherein each village and villager is entitled to a fair use and extraction of Ziz waters. Characteristically, water is diverted in flatter areas to form a canal that irrigates palm groves and other crops as well as supplies domestic use.

== See also ==
- Sijilmasa, a historically important city founded on the banks of the Ziz river

== Sources ==
- Agrawal, Arun; Clark C. Gibson (2001). Communities and the Environment: Ethnicity, Gender. Rutgers University Press. ISBN 0-8135-2914-X.
