= Mohammed al-Ifrani =

Moroccan historian

Mohammad al-Ifrani
- محمد الصغير الإفراني
- Born: 1669/1670; Marrakesh, Morocco
- Died: c. 1742/1743; Marrakesh, Morocco
- Occupations: Historian, Biographer

Abū ʿAbd Allāh Muḥammad ibn Muḥammad al-Ifrānī al-Sūsī al-Marrākushī (Arabic: محمد الصغير الإفراني) (1669/1670–c. 1742/1743), called al-Ṣaghīr, was a Moroccan historian and biographer.

== Biography ==
al-Ifrani was born in 1669/1670 in Marrakesh. His family was from the Ifran tribe, a Shilha Berber tribe of the Draa River basin in the Sous region. He began his studies in his hometown, where he followed the courses of the scholar, Abu al-ʿAbbas Ahmad ibn ʿAli al-Mawasi al-Susi (d. 1718). Then he went to Fez to continue his studies in the al-Qarawiyyin, where he attended the lessons of scholars such as Ahmad ibn Abd el-Hayy al-Halabi and Muhammad ibn ʿAbd al-Rahman ibn ʿAbd al-Qadir al-Fasi.

== Works ==
Some of his works are:

- Nuzhat al-ḥādī bi-akhbār mulūk al-qarn al-ḥādī, a chronicle of the Saadid sultans of Morocco
- al-Maslak al-sahl fi sharḥ tawshīḥ Ibn Sahl, a commentary on Tawshīḥ or Muwashshaḥah of the Andalusian poet, Ibn Sahl
- Safwat man intashar min akhbār sulaḥāʾ al-qarn al-ḥādi ʿashar, a compilation of biographies of 17th-century Moroccan saints
- al-Zill al-warif fī mafākhir Mawlanā Ismāʿīl ibn al-Sharīf (or Rawdat at-tarif), a monograph on the Alaouite sultan of Morocco, Moulay Ismail Ibn Sharif
- Durar al-hijal fi ma'athir sabʿat rijāl, a monograph on the Seven Saints of Marrakesh
- al-Mu'rib fī akhbār al-Maghrib, a general history of Morocco until his time

== Sources ==
- Lévi-Provençal, Évariste (1922). Les historiens des Chorfa: essai sur la littérature historique et biographique au Maroc du XVIe au XXe siècle (in French). Paris: Émile Larose.
- Chadli, Abdellatif (1984). "al-Ifrani, Muhammad al-Saghir". In Toufiq, Ahmed; Hajji, Mohamed (eds.). Ma'lamat al-Maghrib (Encyclopedia of Morocco) (in Arabic). Vol. 2. al-Jamī‘a al-Maghribiyya li-l-Ta’līf wa-l-Tarjama wa-l-Nashr.
