= Tafilalt =

Tafilalt تافيلالت (Arabic) ⵜⴰⴼⵉⵍⴰⵍⵜ (Standard Moroccan Tamazight)
- Traditional Region
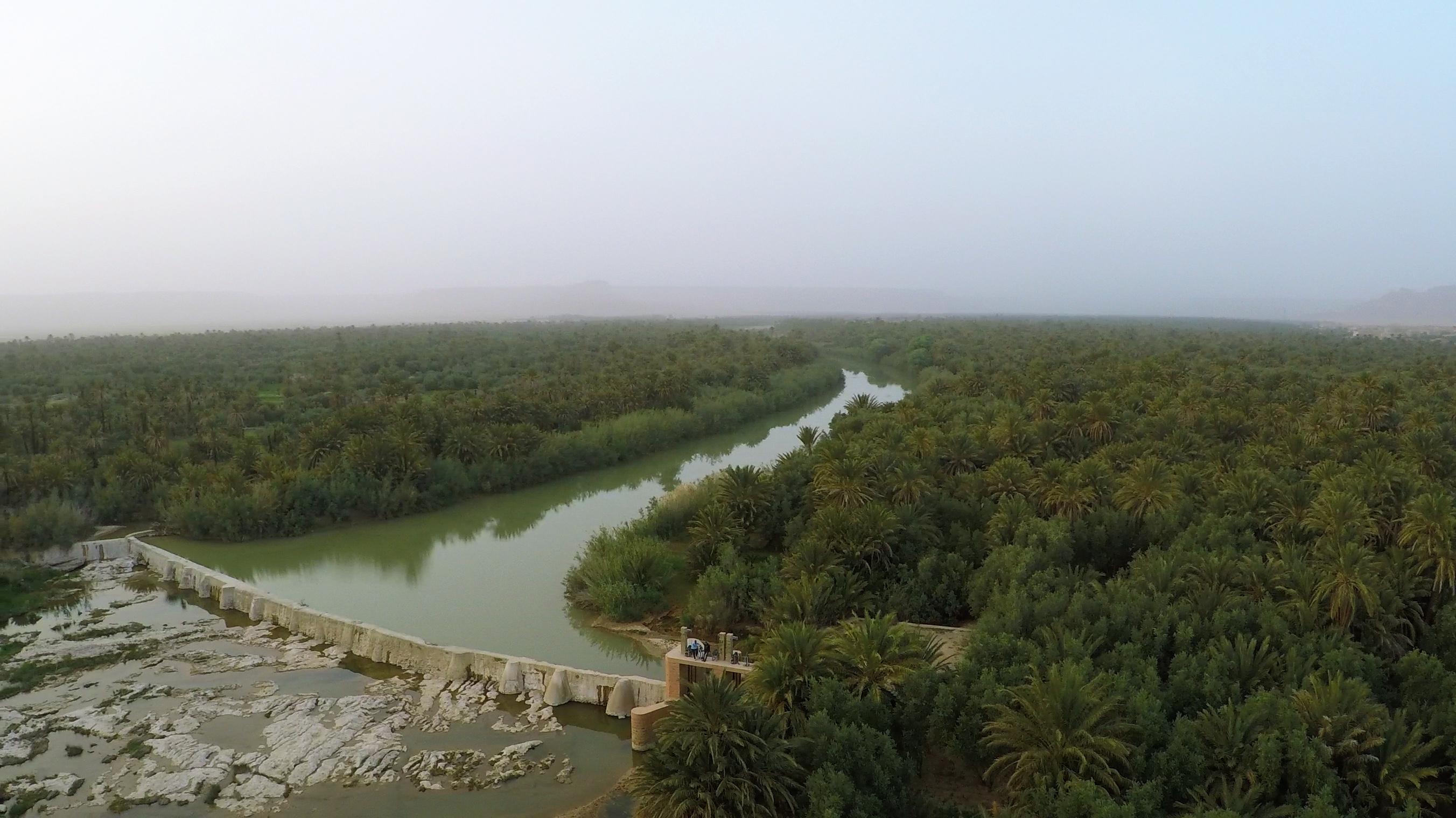
- View of the oasis of Tafilalet, irrigated by the Ziz River.
- Interactive map of Tafilalt
- Coordinates: 31°20′22.43″N 4°16′5.48″W
- Country: Morocco
- Region: Drâa-Tafilalet
- Province: Errachidia Province

Designations

Ramsar Wetland
- Official name: Oasis du Tafilalet
- Designated: 15 January 2005
- Reference no.: 1483

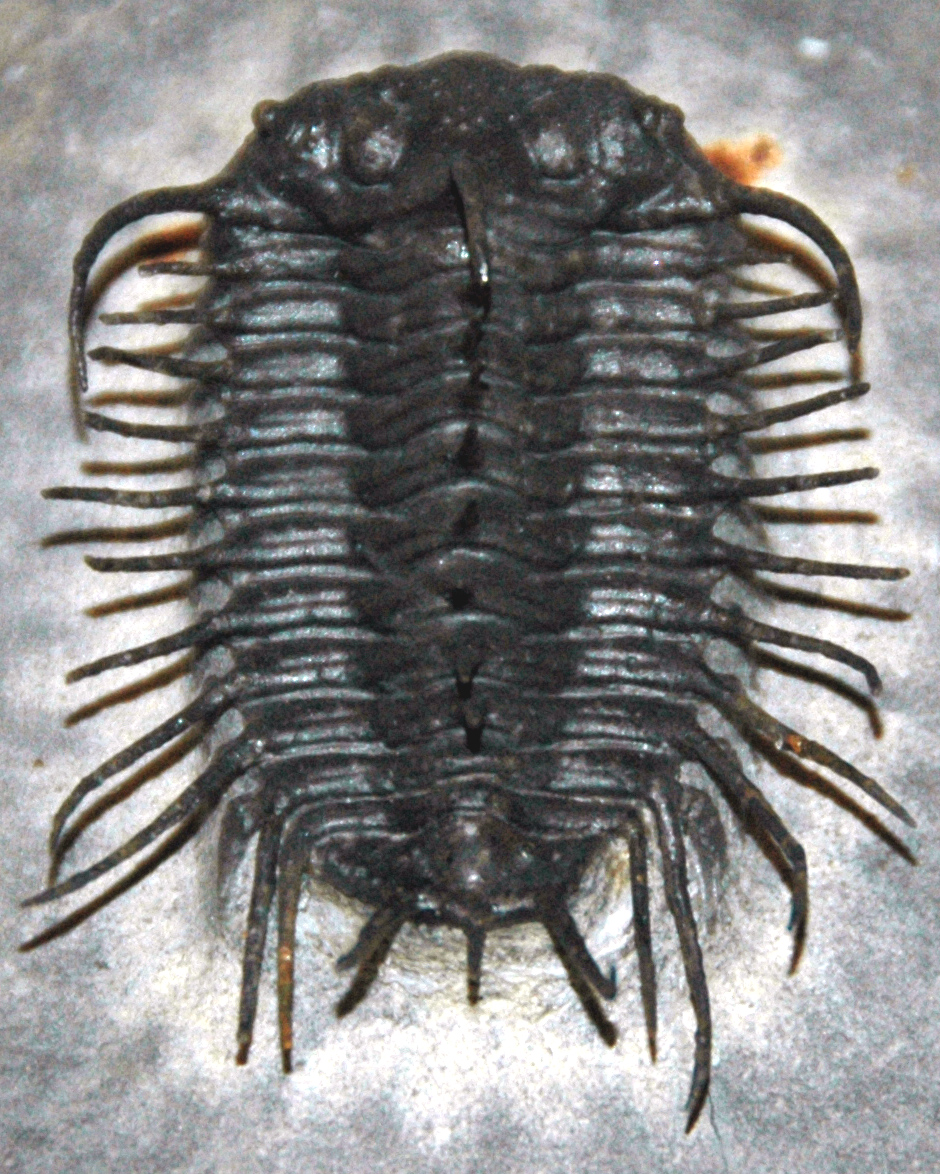
Isoprusia tafilaltana, a fossil trilobite found in (and named after) Tafilalt

Tafilalt (Note: Arabic: تافيلالت, romanized: Tāfīlālt Standard Moroccan Tamazight: ⵜⴰⴼⵉⵍⴰⵍⵜ) or Tafilet, historically Sijilmasa, is a traditional region of Morocco, centered on its largest oasis. It largely corresponds to Errachidia Province.

== Etymology ==
There are many speculations regarding the origin of the word "Tafilalt"; however, it is known that Tafilalt is a Berber word meaning "jug", which is specifically a pottery jar used to store water.

== History ==
Although previous settlements existed, especially during the Roman period, the first continuously inhabited town in the area after the spread of Islam was Sijilmasa, founded by the Midrarid dynasty. It was on the direct caravan route from the Niger River to Tangier, and attained a considerable degree of prosperity.

In the 17th century, the Alawi dynasty of Morocco first achieved political ascendancy in Tafilalt, and in 1606, Sultan Zidan Abu Maali hid in Tafilalt, where he profited from gold mined in the area, built an army, eventually taking control of the city of Marrakesh. A few years later in 1610, Ahmed ibn Abi Mahalli also built up an army in the Tafilalt area and took Marrakesh back for himself, but lost control after Sidi Yahya ben Younes liberated the city for Zidan. A decade after this, a revolutionary movement arose in Tafilalt against the ruling sultan, but was repressed after four months of skirmishes. Later, Tafilalt was a major center of the Dila'ites. In 1648, a custom was established by Moorish sultans of Morocco sending superfluous sons or daughters who would not inherit titles or power to Tafilalt.

The medieval traveler Ibn Battuta wrote about visiting Sijilmasa (near Tafilalt) in the fourteenth century on his journey from Fez to Mali, "the country of the blacks". It was later destroyed in 1818 by the Aït Atta, but its ruins remain, including two gateways. The first European to visit Tafilalt in the modern era was René Caillié (1828), and later Gerhard Rohlfs (1864). English writer W. B. Harris described Tafilalt in a journal after his visit.

== Geography ==
Entirely located along the Ziz River, the oasis was, before mechanized transport, ten days' journey south of Fez and Meknes, across the Atlas Mountains. It is known for its dates.

== Notable residents ==
It was the birthplace of the famed Rabbi Israel Abuhatzeira, known as the "Baba Sali" (Arabic: بابا صلى, Hebrew: באבא סאלי, lit. "Praying Father"), (1889–1984).
