= Morocco–Netherlands relations =

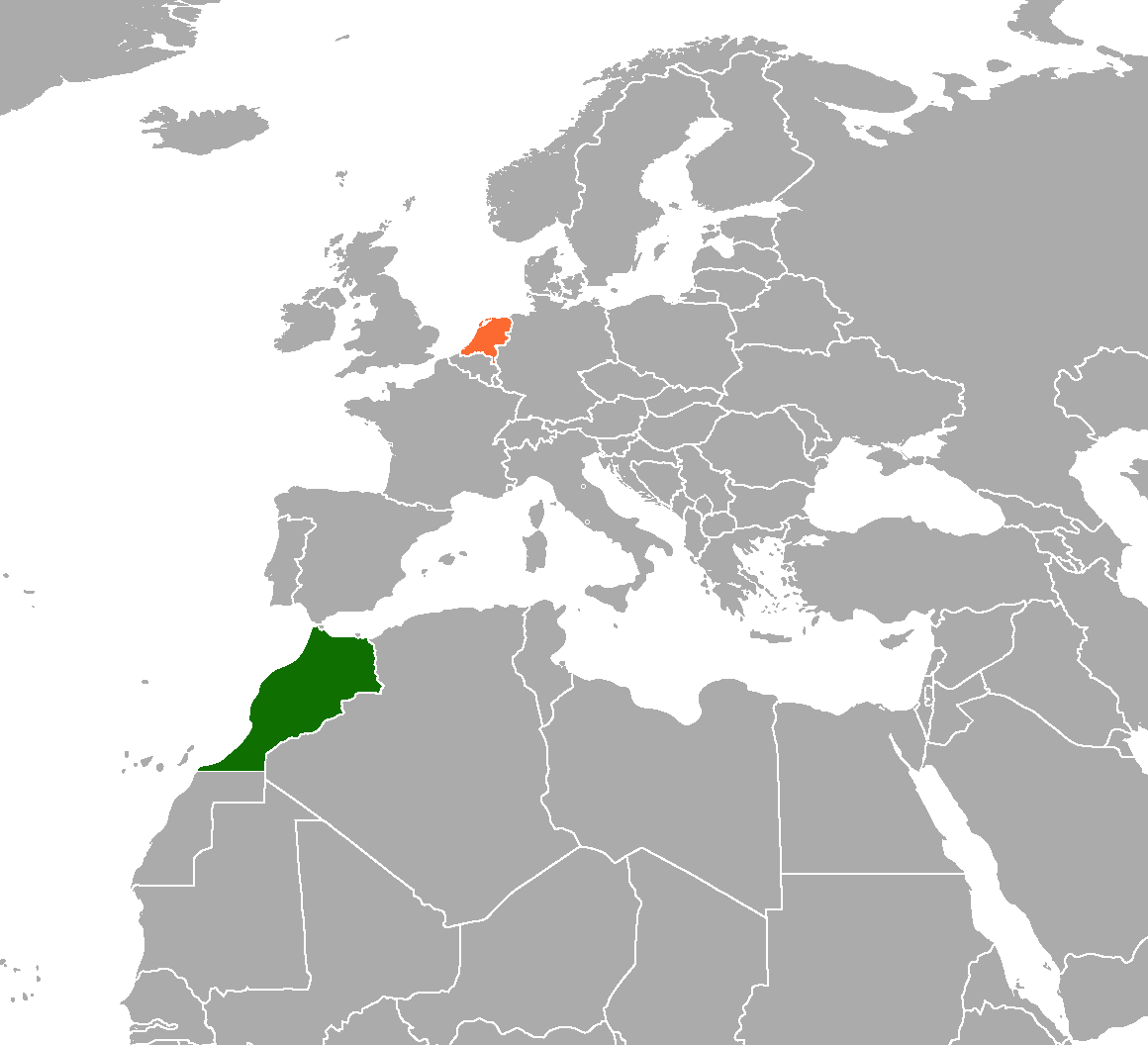
- Morocco: Netherlands

Relations between the Moroccans and the Dutch people of the Kingdom of the Netherlands span a period from the 16th century since the Dutch Revolt period and the era of the Dutch Empire and the Dutch Republic to the present day. The relations between the Moroccans and the Dutch people were strengthened during the reigns of William the Silent and Maurice of Orange, the founding father of the House of Nassau dynasty, the House of Orange-Nassau dynasty and the Kingdom of the Netherlands. Dutch-Moroccans are the third-largest ethnic group in the country. Morocco is represented in the Netherlands by an embassy in The Hague, as well as four consulate-generals in Amsterdam, Rotterdam, 's-Hertogenbosch, and Utrecht. The Netherlands is represented in Morocco by an embassy in Rabat and a consulate-general in Casablanca.

== Treaty of Friendship and Free Commerce (1610) ==
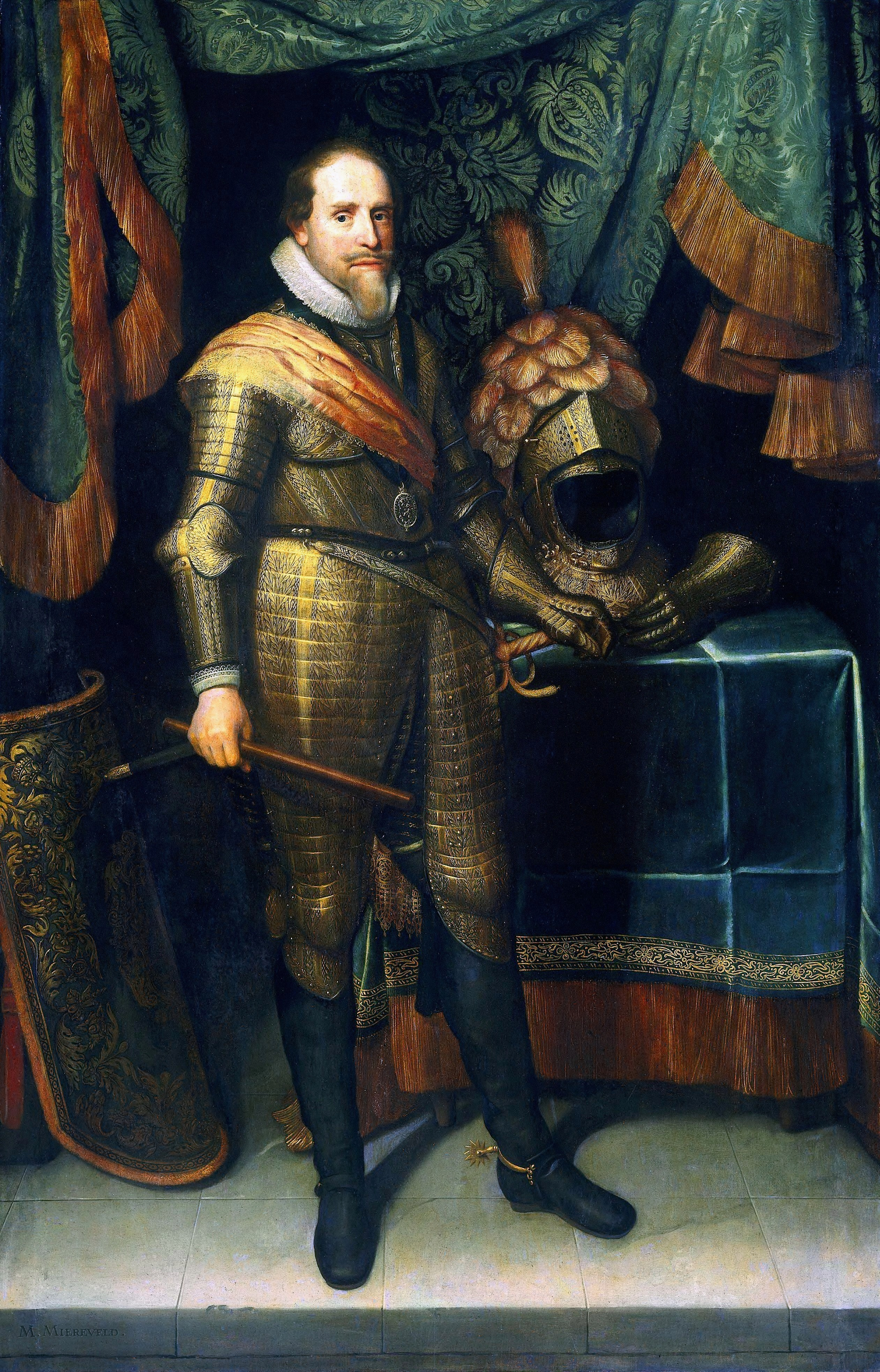
Al-Hajari discussed an alliance with Maurice of Orange in 1613.

From the end of the 16th century, the Netherlands had been attempting to establish friendly relations with Islamic countries, such as the Ottoman Empire and Morocco, due to their common enmity with Spain.

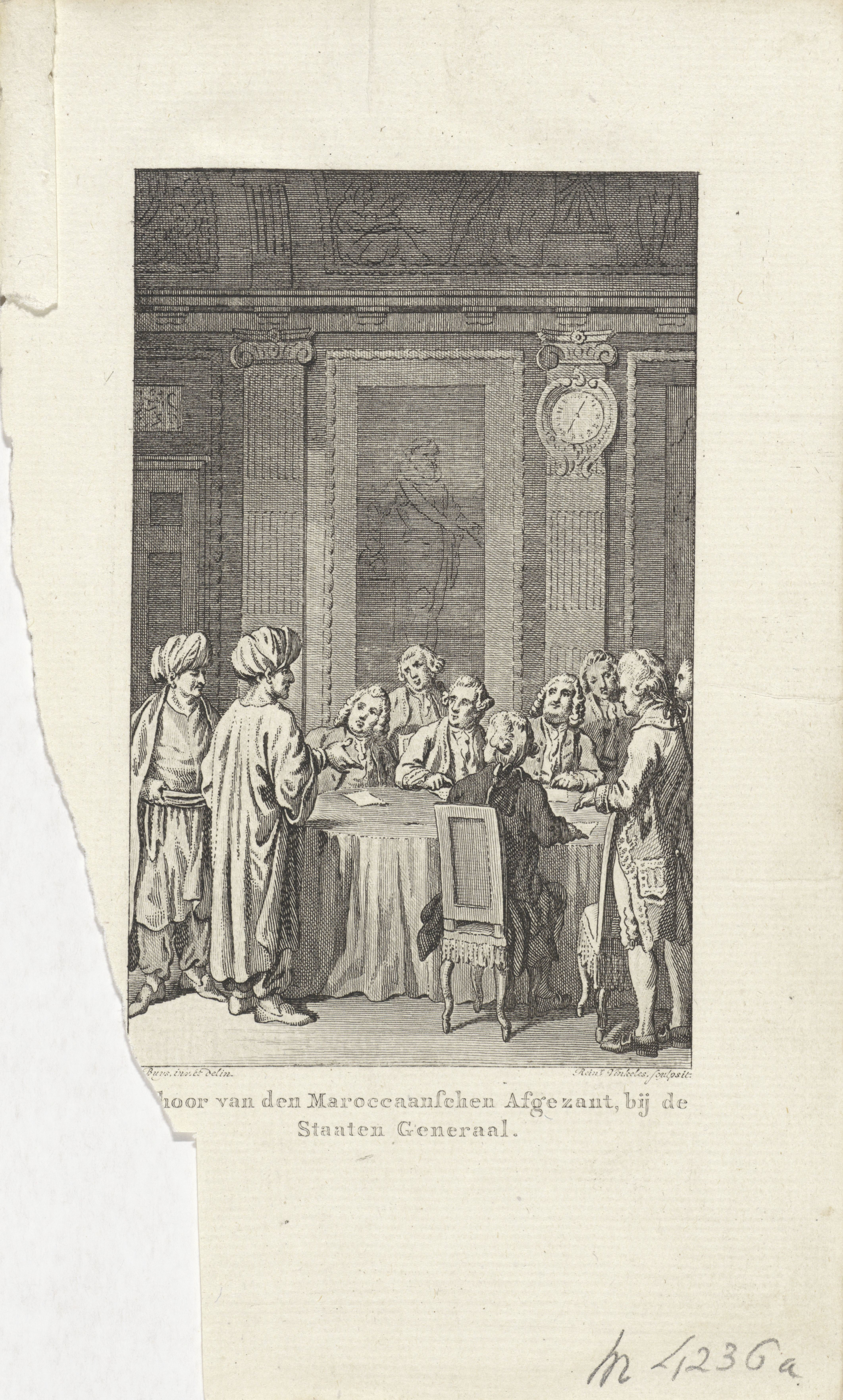
Moroccan envoy talking to the States General of the Netherlands

Some meagre attempts took place under Ahmad al-Mansur until his death in 1603. In April–May 1605, Pieter Marteen Coy returned to Safi in Morocco and Algiers 135 Muslim captives, both Turkish and Moorish, who had been seized by the Dutch in a naval encounter with Spanish galleys. From 1605, Coy became representative of the States General in Marrakesh.

From 1608, the new Moroccan Sultan Mulay Zidan, developed a Treaty of Friendship with the Low Countries, and sent several envoys there, such as Samuel Pallache (and other members of the Pallache family), Hammu ben Bashir, Muhammad Alguazir, Al-Hajari and Yusuf Biscaino. As a result of these exchanges, the Dutch are known to have sent 3 warships requested by Mulay Zidan. Philip III of Spain used these military exchanges as one of the justifications for his expulsion of the Moriscos from Spain in 1609.

A "Treaty of Friendship and Free Commerce" was signed between the two countries in December 1610, offering "free access and friendly reception for their respective subjects with any need for safeguard or safe-conduct, no matter how they come to the others' territory".

In 1613, Al-Hajari visited the Dutch Republic, which he could visit freely due to the existence of a Treaty of Friendship. He stayed from June to September. He discussed with the Dutch Prince Maurice of Orange the possibility of an alliance between the Dutch Republic, the Ottoman Empire, Morocco and the Moriscos, against the common enemy Spain. His book mentions the discussion for a combined offensive on Spain, as well as the religious reasons for the good relations between Islam and Protestantism at the time:

Their teachers [Luther and Calvin] warned them [Protestants] against the Pope and the worshippers of Idols; they also told them not to hate the Muslims because they are the sword of God in the world against the idol-worshippers. That is why they side with the Muslims.

— Al-Hajari, The Book of the Protector of Religion against the Unbelievers

The two countries also had a short war called the Dutch-Moroccan War (1775-1777), however despite this war the countries continued having great relations throughout history.

== Islamic studies ==
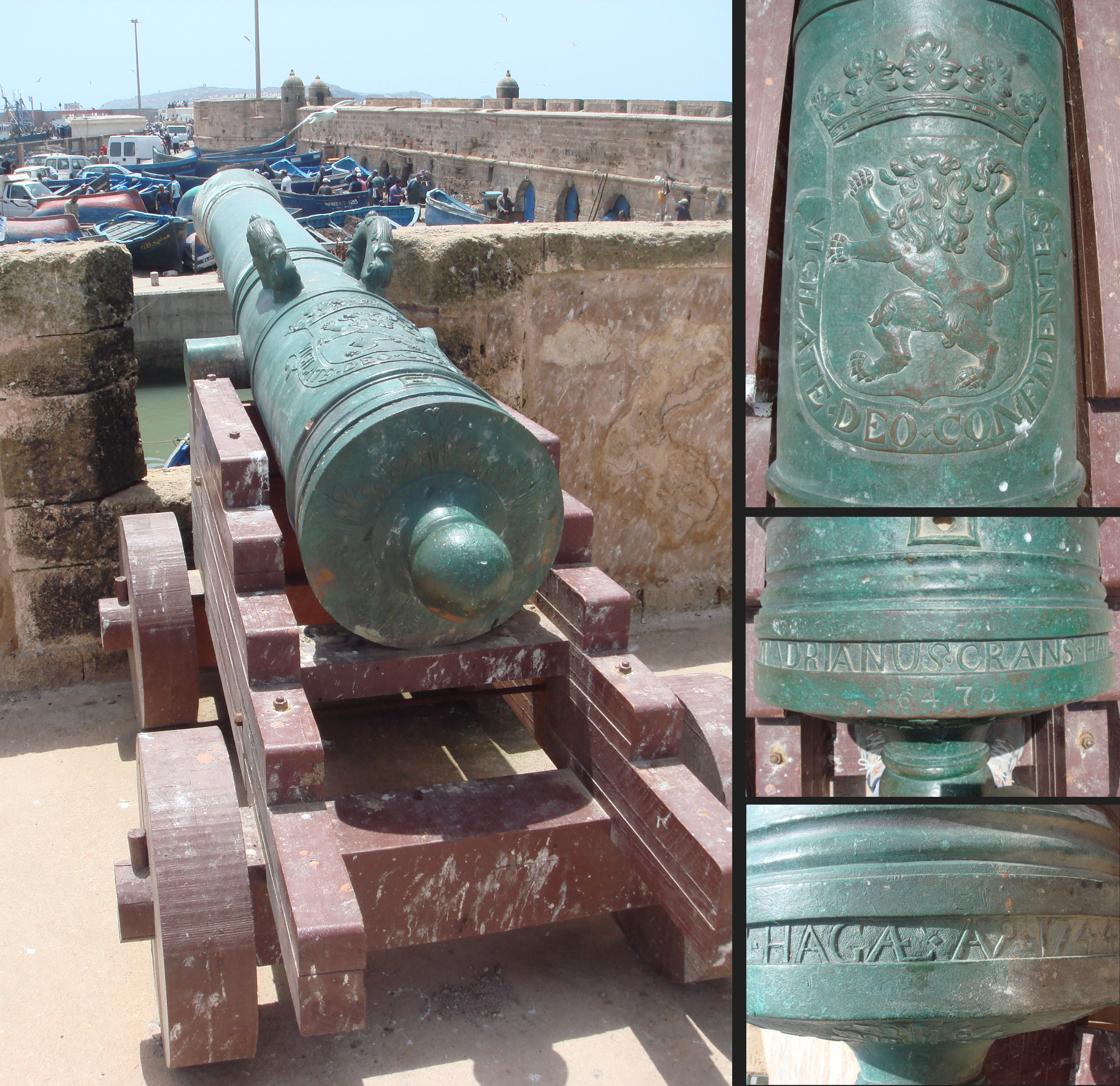
Dutch cannon made by Adrianus Crans in the Hague in 1744, installed in Essaouira, Morocco.

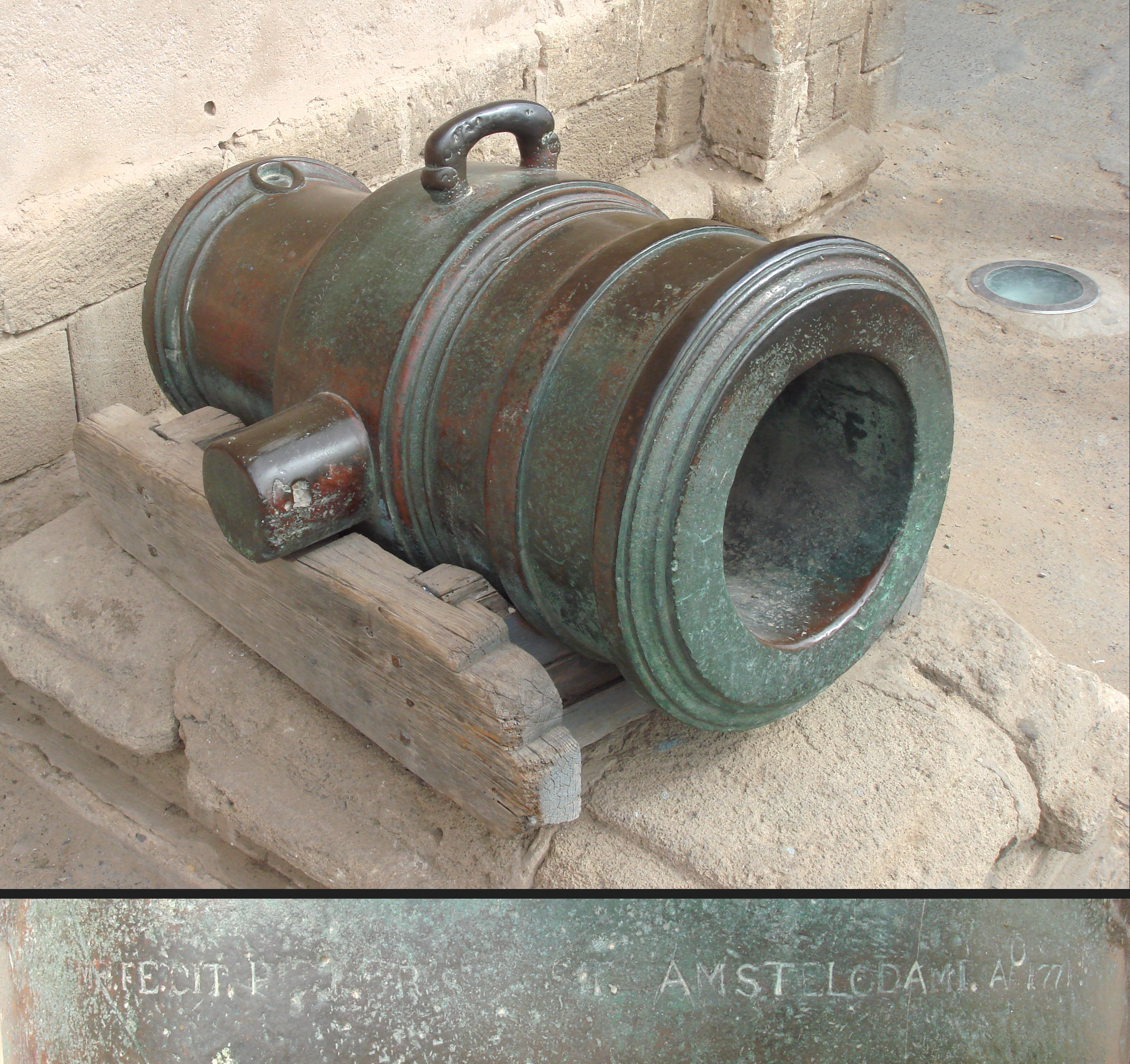
Dutch bombard made in Amsterdam in 1771, installed in Essaouira, Morocco.

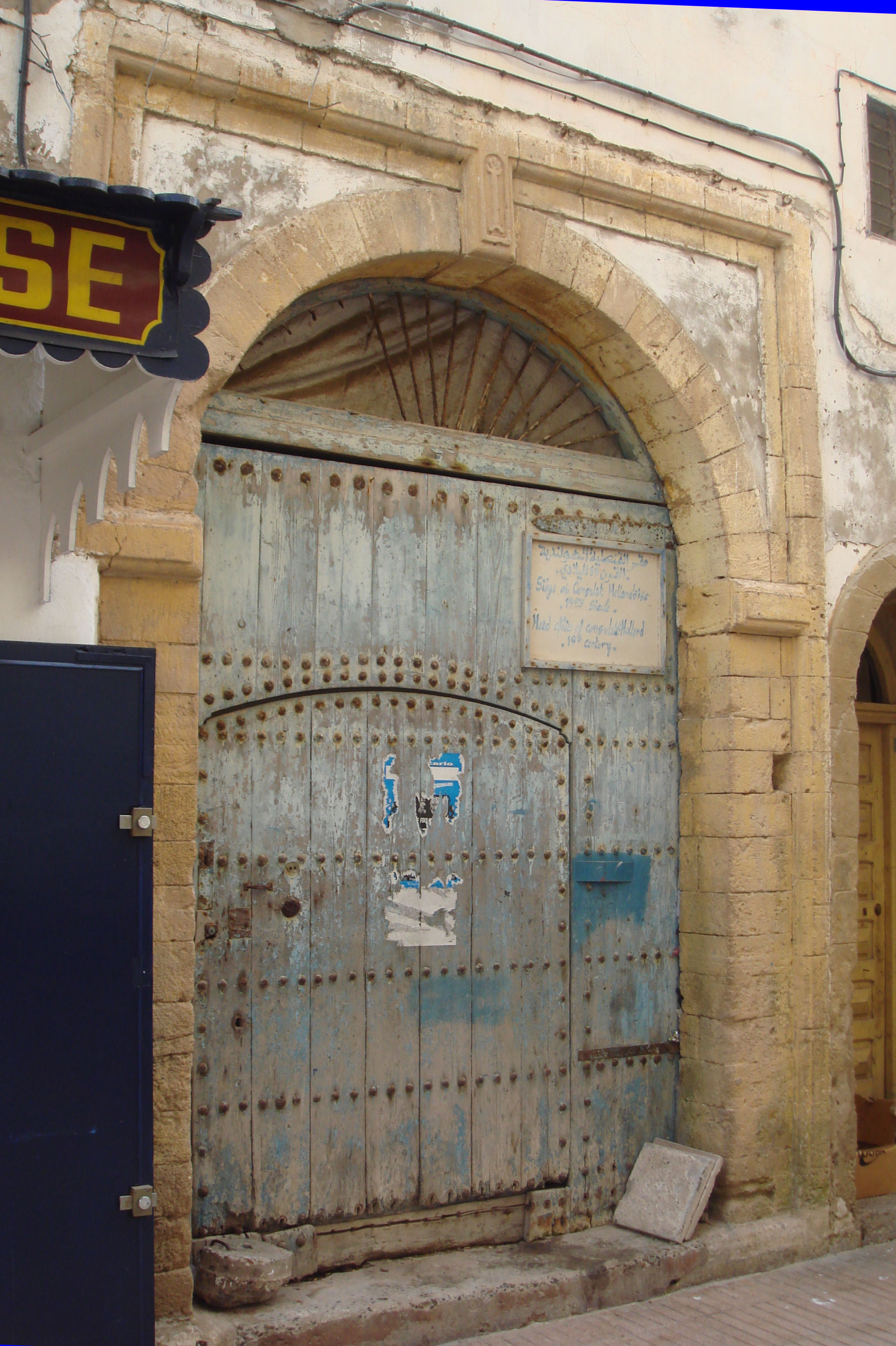
Remains of the 19th century Dutch Consulate in Essaouira, Morocco.

Religious discussions also occurred. The early embassy of Hammu ben Bashi in late-1609 early-1610, led to the redaction of a polemical pamphlet about Christology entitled Inquisitio et responsio quae fuit inter Mahumetitsam et Christianum de Mesia ad intelligendum an ille sit filius Dei nec ne ("Investigation and its response, which has come about between a Muhammedan and a Christian in order to understand whether or not the Messiah is he son of God").

One of the ambassadors, Yusuf Biscaino, met with Prince Maurice of Nassau who inquired to him about Islamic opinions on Jesus. He preferred not to answer on the spot, but later sent a letter to Maurice. After returning to Marrakesh, Yusuf Biscaino sent the letter in Latin to Maurice in 1611, relying as a source on the work of Muhammad Alguazir.

One of the effects of these exchanges was the remarkable development of Arabic and Islamic studies in the Netherlands, exemplified by the work of Thomas Erpenius. Thomas Epernius was able to advance his knowledge of Arabic through direct exchanges with Moroccan envoys, such as Al-Hajari. Al-Hajara had used the Treaty of Friendship in order to visit the Netherlands freely after a sojourn in France. Thomas Epernius became professor of Oriental Languages at Leiden University in 1613.

== Dutch embassy of 1640 ==
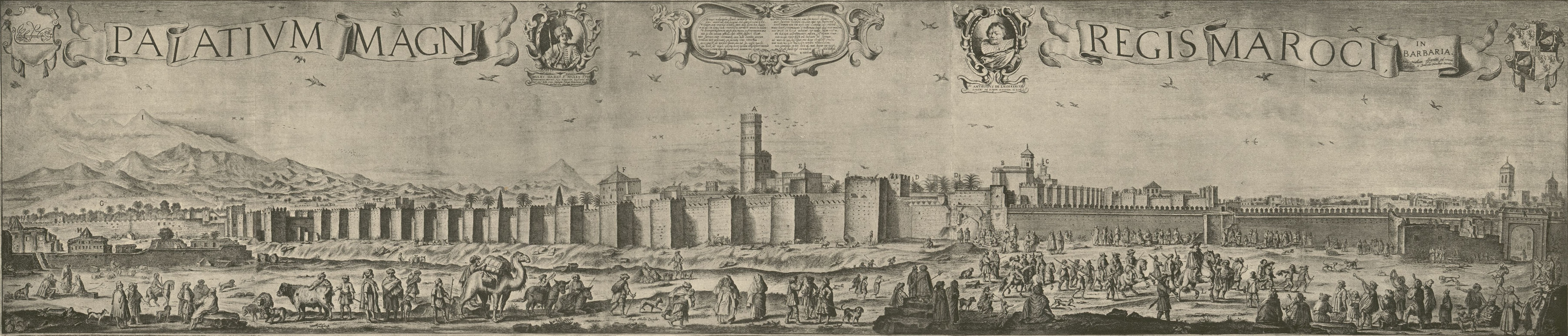
The walls of Marrakesh and El Badi Palace, by Adriaen Matham, 1640.

A Dutch embassy led by Antonius de Liedekerke visited the king of Morocco Mohammed esh Sheikh es Seghir in 1640. The embassy was accompanied by the engraver Adriaen Matham who left numerous drawings, including an engraving of the El Badi Palace, before it was destroyed.

In 1644, Michiel de Ruyter visited the coast of Morocco and traded there extensively.

== Diplomatic missions ==
The Moroccan embassy is located in The Hague.

The Dutch embassy is located in Rabat.

== 2017 diplomatic row ==
On 25 June 2017, the Moroccan Ministry of Foreign Affairs recalled summoned its ambassador in the Netherlands as a gesture of protestation, that came after Said Chaou, a Moroccan dissident established in the Netherlands, appeared in a Facebook live video, commenting the current events in the Hirak Rif. The Moroccan side reiterated its wishes to see Chaou extradited to Morocco where an arrest mandate has been issued for him since 2010, by judge Nourreddine Dahen. The Dutch response was that whilst it was committed to cooperation with the Moroccan government in strict respect of international law, it considered the reaction of the Moroccan government "incomprehensible and futile".

== Resident diplomatic missions ==
- Morocco has an embassy in The Hague and consulates-general in Amsterdam, Rotterdam, 's-Hertogenbosch and Utrecht.
- the Netherlands has an embassy in Rabat.

== See also ==
- Foreign relations of Morocco
- Foreign relations of the Netherlands
- Moroccans in the Netherlands
