= Étienne Hubert (Arabist) =

French medical doctor, Orientalist and diplomat

- Born: Étienne Hubert d'Orléans; 1567; Orléans, France
- Died: 20 June 1614 (aged 46–47); Orléans, France
- Other names: Stephanus Hubertus
- Education: Orléans, Paris (bachelor's degree 1596)
- Scientific career
- Fields: Medicine, orientalism, diplomacy
- Institutions: Marrakesh, Morocco (court medical doctor)
- Patrons: Henry IV, Ahmad al-Mansur

Étienne Hubert d'Orléans (Stephanus Hubertus; 1567 – 20 June 1614) was a French medical doctor, Orientalist and diplomat.

== Biography ==
Born in Orléans, he studied medicine there and in Paris (gaining his Bachelor on 21 April 1596) and became interested in Arabic in order to read medical texts written in that language. In 1598, Henry IV sent him to Marrakesh to the Sultan Ahmad al-Mansur to replace Arnoult de Lisle, who had been recalled to Paris.

Hubert was a court medical doctor for Moroccan ruler Ahmad al-Mansur in Marrakesh from 1598 to 1600. In his position he was able during a year to learn Arabic well. From 1600, Hubert was appointed Royal lecturer in Arabic at the Collège de France, until 1613. The founder of the Chair had been Guillaume Postel, and Hubert succeeded Arnoult de Lisle, who had been his predecessor as medical doctor to the Sultan of Morocco, from 1588 to 1598. He was succeeded in the teaching position by Gabriel Sionita, who was active from 1614 to 1648.

While in France in 1611, Hubert was able to meet with the Moroccan envoy Al-Hajari through the introduction of Thomas Erpenius. Hubert offered to help him in his proceeding and to represent him "to all people of authority". Savary de Brèves judged rather negatively of his skills as an Arabist, but he was admired by Thomas Erpenius. He retired to Orléans, where he died on 20 June 1614, aged forty-seven, and was buried in the cloister of the monastery of St. Samson, where his uncle was prior. His epitaph in Hebrew, Arabic, Greek, and Latin was written by his former students.

Isaac Casaubon was another famous Arabist of that time, as well as Jean Martin, who would also become professor at the Collège de France, and Abudacnus, an Egyptian Copt from Cairo who gave lessons in Arabic to European linguists.
