= Zaydani Library =

Collection of Moroccan manuscripts

The Zaydani Library (Arabic: الخزانة الزيدانية, Al-Khizāna Az-Zaydāniyya) or the Zaydani Collection is a collection of manuscripts originally belonging to Sultan Zaydan Bin Ahmed that were taken by Spanish privateers in Atlantic waters off the coast of Morocco in 1612. The collection is held to this day in the library of El Escorial.

The manuscripts are of great academic importance, and represent one of the most famous library collections in the history of Morocco. The collection is composed of works from the personal libraries of Sultan Zaydan Bin Ahmed and his father Sultan Ahmed al-Mansur, his brother Sheikh al-Ma'mun, and Abu Faris. The library contained treatises in different fields and in a number of different languages, among them Turkish, Persian, and Latin.

Moroccan diplomats had been asking for them from the beginning of the 17th century. On July 16, 2013, President of the Spanish Patrimonio Nacional José Rodríguez Spitieri delivered microfilm scans of the documents, in the presence of King Juan Carlos I of Spain, to King Mohammed VI of Morocco at the National Library of the Kingdom of Morocco.

== History ==
When Ahmed ibn Abi Mahalli proclaimed himself mehdi and led a revolt against the Saadi Dynasty, Sultan Zaydan was forced to flee Marrakesh for the port of Asfi to sail to Agadir. He hired a ship named Notre Dame de la Garde belonging to the French consul Jean Phillipe de Castellane to transport his belongings, including a library containing an estimated 4,000 manuscripts in different fields of literature and sciences. The ship was about to depart for Marseille when the sultan loaded his belongings—including his crown and staff—and ordered the consul to sail them to Agadir for 3000 ducat or gold dirhams.

Zaydan took another ship, one from Holland, for himself and his servants and followers, as well as some of his loyal knights. The two ships arrived in Agadir together on June 16, 1612, and Zaydan left the Dutch ship the same day accompanied by his wives and his servants. De Castellane refused to unload his ship until receiving 3000 gold dirhams. On June 22, after waiting for 6 days for the arrival of the money, which was delayed due to the instability, de Castellane left the port of Agadir for Murcia carrying the sultan's library, crown, staff, clothes, and other belongings.

Castellane's ship was intercepted by a squadron of four Spanish ships from Admiral Luis Fajardo's fleet. The anger of the sultan manifested itself in his letters to King Louis XIII of France, who did no more than denounce Castellane (who was imprisoned in Madrid). For this reason, and because the library was not, in fact, in France, Louis XIII refused to see the sultan's ambassador, Ahmed al-Jazuli.

Abu Zakriya al-Hahi (أبو زكرياء الحاحي) also came into possession of some of the works of the library when leaving Marrakesh for the Sous after having gone to Marrakesh to protect Sultan Zaydan from the revolting Ahmed ibn Abi Mahalli. What remained of the Zaydani library was scattered throughout the kingdom, settling in different private and public libraries.

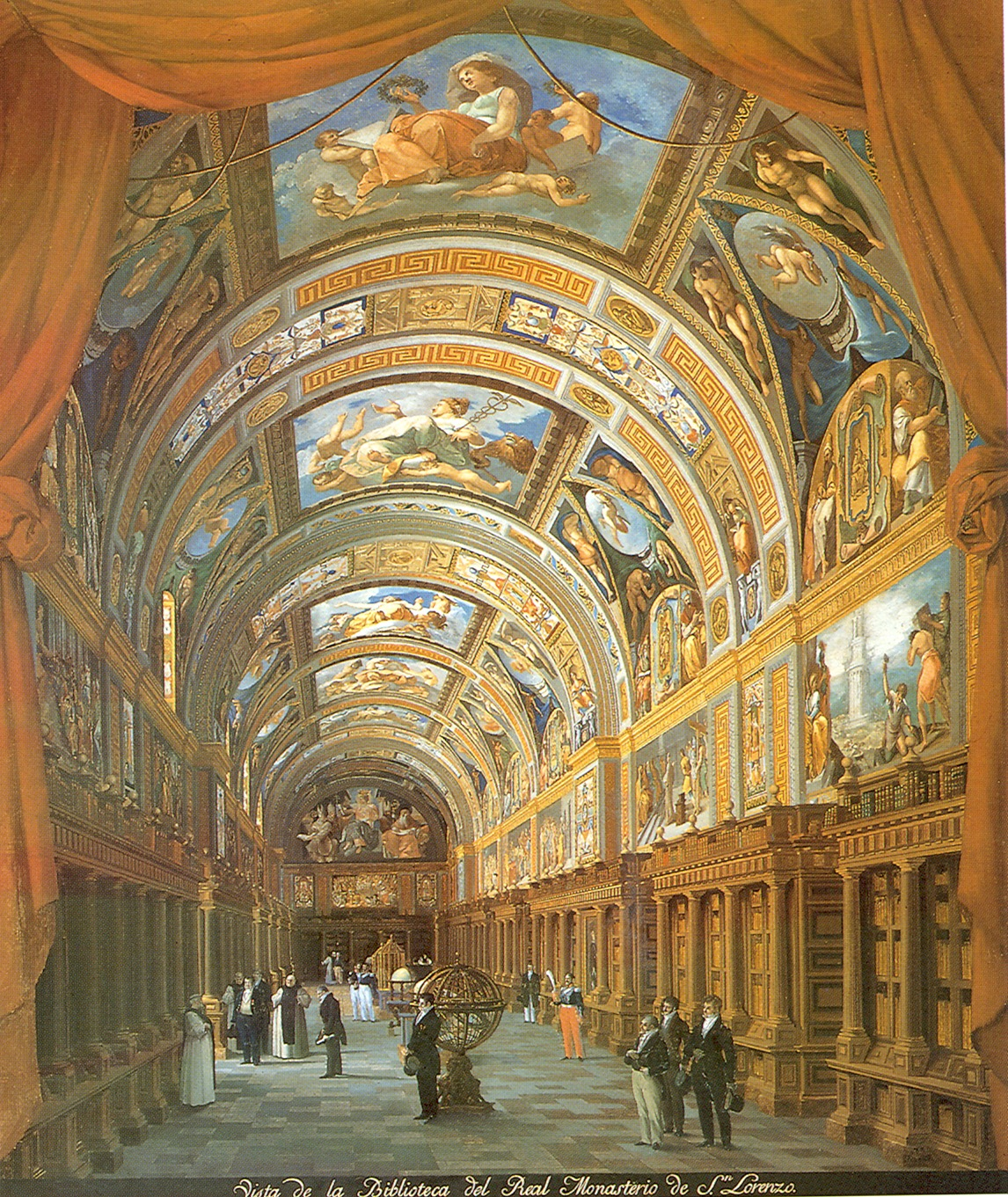
The library of El Escorial around 1830.

In 1671, a fire engulfed El Escorial, burning a large portion of the manuscripts. Only approximately 2,000 were saved, and these are what remain of the Zaydani library today.

== Indexing ==
Upon the library's arrival in 1612, a thorough index of its contents was made by Francisco de Gurmendi. Gurmendi was succeeded by David Colville (c. 1581-1629), a Scottish orientalist. The work of these two men would have identified for posterity which books precisely came from Morocco, and could have provided a full account of which manuscripts had burned in the fire. Unfortunately, both Gurmendi's and Colville's indices were also apparently lost in the fire.

After the fire, the Spanish government invited Miguel Casiri to work in the department of translation at the Royal Library of El Escorial as an interpreter of Eastern languages for King Charles III, to study Arabic manuscripts and present reports on them to the king. Casiri's reports laid the foundations of Oriental studies in Spain, and he was later appointed director of the El Escorial Library in 1749. He's also indexed and catalogued the huge collection of Arabic manuscripts held at El Escorial. His catalogue took the form of an annotated bibliography with excerpts demonstrating the value of the manuscripts of particular importance, and translations of these excerpts into Latin. Casiri named this bibliography Bibliotheca Arabico-Hispana Escurialensis, publishing the first volume in 1760 and the second ten years later in 1770.

This catalogue was translated into Arabic during the reign of the Moroccan Sultan Suleiman Al-Alawi from 1792 to 1823 at the recommendation of the Moroccan vizier and man of letters Muhammad Bin Abd As-Salām As-Slāwi. The Arabic translation was completed on May 23, 1811. There is only one copy of this translation in existence, part of Hassan II's manuscript collection in the Royal Library kept at the royal palace, Dar al-Makhzen, in Rabat:

The group of folios gathered in this book was published under the order of the renowned theologian, a vizier of the noble chamber exalted through God, Sir Muhammad Bin Abd As-Salām As-Slāwi, may God assist him—for there it contains no more and no less than what was written in the two volumes printed in Madrid by the Christian Michael Casiri. His work was named "Bibliotheca Arabico-Hispana Escurialensis."

=== French orientalists ===
The French orientalist Hartwig Derenbourg completed a catalogue in 1884 entitled "Les manuscrits arabes de l’Escurial ," and in 1928 the orientalist Évariste Lévi-Provençal published Derenbourg's inventory of the manuscripts in 3 volumes.

== Demands for the return of the library ==
Moroccan demands for the return of this collection date back to the Saadi dynasty, beginning with Sultan Zaydan himself, followed by his son Sultan Al Walid. The sultans of the Alawite dynasty also expended great efforts to return the Zaydani Library. All of the Moroccan diplomats to Spain in the Alawite dynasty demanded the return of not only the Zaydani Library, but all Arabo-Andalusi manuscripts in Spain. The first attempt came from Sultan Zaydan himself, who attempted to open negotiations with the Spanish court for the sake of returning his books, and offered 60,000 gold dirhams in exchange for them, and repeated these attempts a number of times without any success until his death in 1037 / 1626 and his descendants didn't stop asking for their return, either.

After the collapse of Saadi Dynasty, Moroccans continued to press for the return of the books through the Alawite Dynasty.

The Spanish Arabist Nieves Paradela Alonso (es) mentioned that most Arab travelers to Spain addressed the importance of the Arabic books and manuscripts found in El Escorial. Among the most prominent of these voyageurs were three Moroccan diplomats who visited Spain in succeeding historical periods, going there to negotiate with the Spanish monarchs Carlos II and Carlos III over the matter of the numerous Moroccan manuscripts present in El Escorial and their return to Morocco.

These ambassadors are the vizier Muhammad Bin Abd el-Wahab Al-Ghassani Al-Fassi whose diplomatic mission went to Spain in 1011هـ hijri /1690 the period of Sultan Ismail and who recorded his journey in his book The Journey of the Vizier to Release the Captive (رحلة الوزير في افتكاك الأسير) in which he described the wing of the library where Zaydan's books and manuscripts were kept and his negotiation with Carlos II for the release of Muslims held prisoners and the return of some manuscripts to Morocco. The Spanish king conceded to the first request, but not the request for the books, which he claimed had been burned.

The second ambassador was Ahmed ibn Al-Mahdi Al-Ghazzal Al-Fassi, representative of Sultan Mohammed III ben Abdallah to King Carlos III 1179 hijri 1766. Al-Ghazzal authored the book The Result of the Discretion Between Armistice and Jihad (نتيجة الاجتهاد في المهادنة و الجهاد). The case of the manuscripts held an important place in this visit, as the ambassador visited El Escorial and the Spanish king gave him some of the manuscripts:

The king of Spain ordered the collection to be taken out and we added to what we had brought from Granada. We left with this bundle after having delivered 300 prisoners, exchanging each for a book of the books of Islam, may God save them from the lands of the infidels.

The third ambassador was Muhammad Bin Othman Al-Maknasi, ambassador of Sultan Muhammad III to the court of Charles III, who visited Spain somewhere between 1193 and 1194 (هـ) or 1779–1780 to sign an agreement to renew relations between the two countries and release Algerian prisoners held in Spain. Like his predecessors, he didn't forget to visit the El Escorial Monastery, where he stopped for a long time at the Arabic manuscripts. In his book The Book of Elixir in Freeing the Captive (كتاب الإكسير في فكاك الأسير), Al-Maknasi noted:

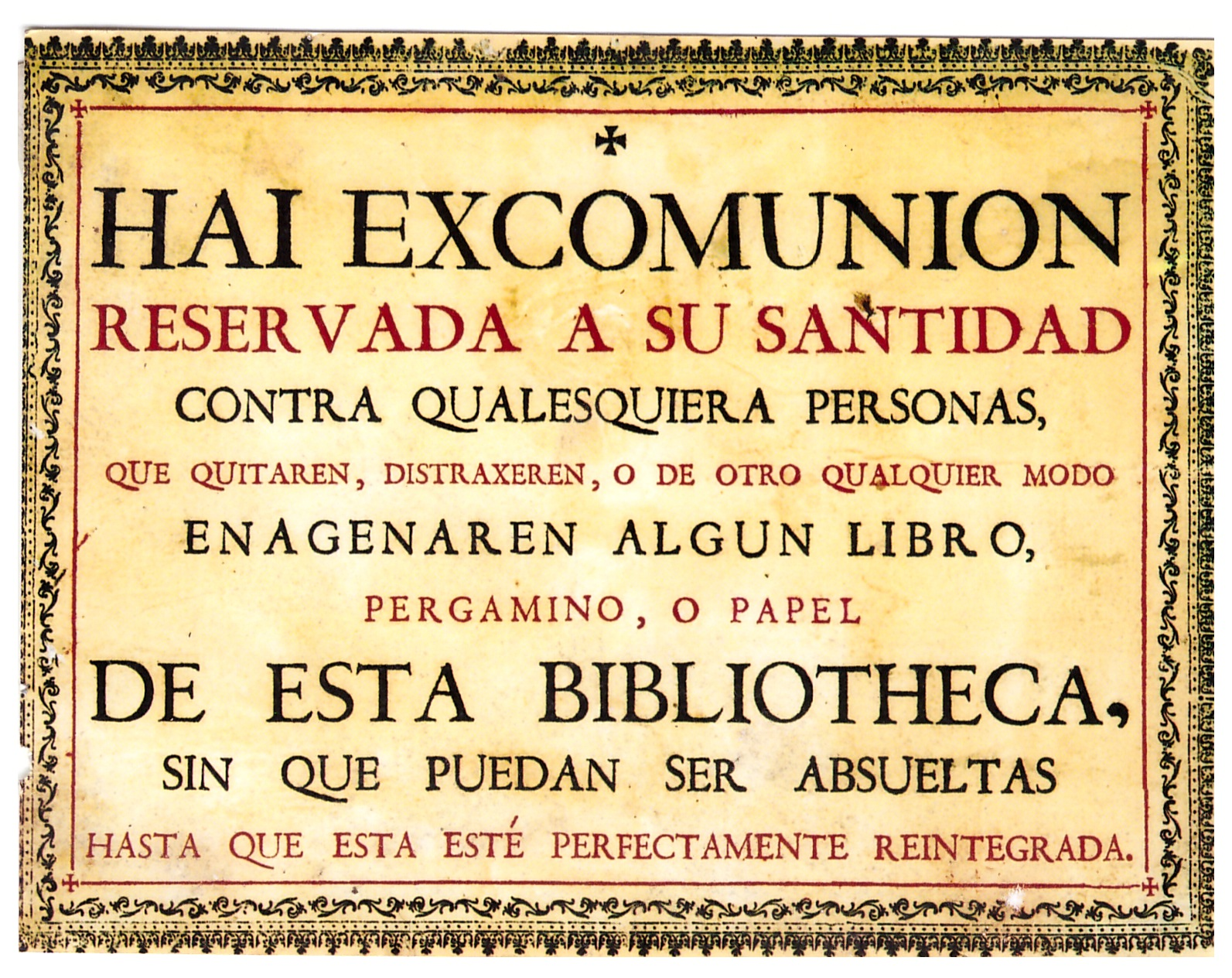
The ambassador saw a sign similar to this threat of excommunication against book thieves.

The books were very well-preserved, and it was written in foreign script on the door to the collection: "The Pope orders that nothing be taken from this collection." Answering to the compulsions within us, they opened the door to the collection for us on his order, showing us the books of the Muslims, numbering one thousand eight hundred manuscripts, among them two copies of the Holy Quran, and a number of works of Quranic exegesis—all of which were annotated—in addition to many books on medicine. I read what the limited time allowed, then I left the collection with the flame of sorrows ignited within my heart. I would call for revenge, for none had taken revenge for this. I wish I had never seen it—but this El Escorial is, in the end, a wonder of the world.

The king of Spain gave the ambassador a number of Arabic manuscripts, but they were not from the El Escorial collection.

== 2009 Agreement ==
After Omar Azziman's 4 years of negotiations in Madrid, when Bensalem Himmich was head of the Moroccan Ministry of Culture, an agreement of Scientific Cooperation between the National Library of the Kingdom of Morocco and the Library of El Escorial in December 2009 allowed the reproduction of a number of Arabic manuscripts and especially those of the Zaydani collection as microfilm copies. The reproduction would also comprise the manuscripts originally kept in the public library in Tetuan, which were taken during the period of the Spanish protectorate in Morocco. This will help the situation for Moroccan researchers who will no longer have to go to Madrid to study the manuscripts and documents of this library.

The ceremonial presentation of the digital copies of 1,939 manuscripts took place on Tuesday, July 16, 2013. The ceremonies were presided by King Juan Carlos of Spain and a delegation from the Spanish Cultural Heritage Institute as well as Mohammed VI of Morocco.

== Contents ==
Among the contents of the Zaydani Collection at El Escorial there are:

- The original Arabic text of Ibn al-Khatiib's Muqni'at al-Sā'il 'an al-Maraḍ al-Hā'il (مقنعة السائل عن المرض الهائل), a treatise from c. 1362 about the Black Death MS Arabic 1785
