= Guillaume Bérard =

16th-century French doctor and diplomat

Guillaume Bérard was a French Consul established in Fez, Morocco, in 1577 by Henry III of France. He was the first European to be named Consul in Morocco. His nomination followed the mission of Louis Cabrette, a French captain who had been used as an envoy to France by Sultan Al-Malek in 1576. Guillaume Bérard was born in Saorge near Nice.

Guillaume Bérard was a doctor by profession, who first went to live in Constantinople. In 1574, he saved the life of Moroccan prince Abd al-Malik during an epidemic in Constantinople, where he was then in exile since the death of Moulay Abdallah in January 1574. They later became friends due to this event. When Abd al-Malik became Sultan, he asked Henry III of France that Guillaume Bérard be appointed Consul of France. Berard, who was a subject of the Duke of Savoy, was then naturalized French, and on 10 June 1577 he was elevated to the position of Consul of France "to the King of Fez and Morocco".

After the Battle of Ksar el Kebir in 1578, Guillaume Bérard returned to France to announce the enthronement of Abd al-Malik's successor, Moulay Ahmad al-Mansur.

Guillaume Bérard was succeeded by Arnoult de Lisle as physician to the Sultan in 1588.

The first Moroccan mission to France would be that of Al-Hajari in 1610–11, followed by Ahmed el-Guezouli in 1612–1613.

== See also ==
- France-Morocco relations
