= Arnoult de Lisle =

French physician, Arabist and diplomat

- Born: 1556; Paris
- Died: 25 November 1613 (aged about 57); Paris
- Other names: Arnould de l'Isle, Arnulphus de Lislo, Arnulphus de Insulanus
- Known for: Promoting relations between France and Morocco
- Relatives: Louis Duret (father-in-law)
- Scientific career
- Fields: Medicine, Arabic culture
- Institutions: Collège de France
- Patrons: Henry III of France, Henry IV of France

Arnoult de Lisle (1556–1613) was a French physician, Arabist, and diplomat of the 16th and 17th centuries.

As a young physician, he married the daughter of Louis Duret, a follower of Avicenna, in 1586.

== Morocco (1588–98) ==
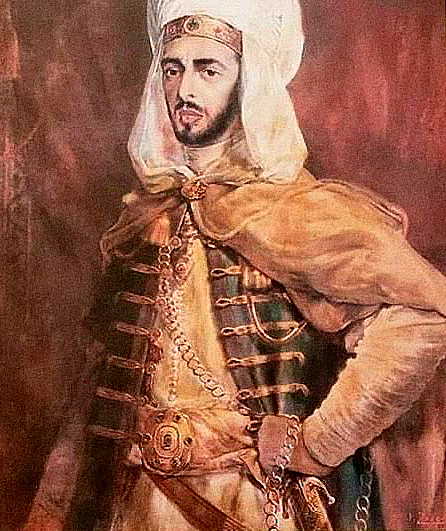
Arnoult de Lisle was physician to Ahmad al-Mansur.

In 1587, Arnoult de Lisle was appointed at 31 as the first professor of the chair of Arabic founded for him by Henry III of France at the Collège de France, and received the title of "lecteur et professeur du Roy en langue Arabique".

Arnoult de Lisle was soon sent to Morocco, however, to become physician to the Sultan of Morocco from 1588 to 1598 at the instigation of Henry III of France. He had become interested in the position in order to learn the Arabic language on the spot as a way to further his medical knowledge. He succeeded Guillaume Bérard, who had been physician to Abd al-Malik and then El-Mansour, in this position. Although Arnoult de Lisle was not officially Consul, he acted as an agent to the king of France and played a diplomatic role. He was based in Marrakesh, while another Frenchman, Georges Fornier, a former assistant to Guillaume Bérard, was based in Fès. Arnoult de Lisle was then succeeded by Étienne Hubert d'Orléans from 1598 to 1600.

== Professor of Arabic at the College de France (1598–1613) ==
He returned to France to become the professor of Arabic at the Collège de France. He held the teaching position until 1613, although he doesn't seem to have taught regularly, and continued with diplomatic endeavours. Abudacnus worked as an interpreter for him at the College de France.

In 1606–7, Henry IV of France again sent Arnoult de Lisle to Morocco as ambassador, in order to obtain the observance of past friendship treaties.
