= Abdallah al-Ghalib II =

Saadi Sultan (died c. 1623)

Sultan of Marrakesh
- Reign: 1606 – 1609

Sultan of (Fes)
- Reign: 1609 – 1613
- Predecessor: Abu Faris Abdallah
- Successor: Zidan Abu Maali
- Born: Saadi Sultanate
- Died: c. 1623; Saadi Sultanate
- Abdallah al-Ghalib II bin Mohammed esh Sheikh el Mamun
Era dates
- (16th–17th Centuries)
- Dynasty: Saadi dynasty
- Father: Muhammad al-Sheikh al-Ma'mun
- Religion: Sunni Islam

Abdallah al-Ghalib II (died c. 1623) was a member of the Saadian dynasty who ruled parts of present-day Morocco during the succession conflicts within the dynasty between 1603 and 1627. He was the son of Muhammad al-Sheikh al-Ma'mun, who was in turn the son of the powerful sultan Ahmad al-Mansur. He ruled in Marrakesh from 1606 to 1609 and ruled in Fes from 1609 to 1613.

== Life ==
During this period, the Saadian realm was divided into two main regions: one region of the realm was ruled from the main capital in Marrakesh, with the other region ruled from Fes in the north. Control of both regions changed hands multiple times.

Abdallah ruled from Marrakesh between 1606 and 1609. In 1609 he successfully ordered the assassination of his uncle Abu Faris Abdallah al-Wathiq, who was established in Fes at the time. After 1609 he then ruled in Fes (as his father had previously done) until his death around 1623, while Zaydan al-Nasir ruled in Marrakesh.

Early in his period of leadership in Fes, in 1609, he commissioned the construction of a second ablutions pavilion in the courtyard (sahn) of the famous Qarawiyyin Mosque in Fes, copying the other pavilion previously built here by Ahmad al-Mansur in 1587 (the two pavilions stand across from each other today).
