= Muhammad al-Shaykh al-Ma'mun =

Saadi Dynasty ruler in Morocco (1566–1613)

- Sub-ruler of Saadi Dynasty

Saadi Sultan
- Reign: 1603 – 1613
- Predecessor: Ahmad al-Mansur
- Successor: Zidan Abu Maali
- Born: c. 1566; Saadi Sultanate
- Died: c. 1613 (aged 46–47); Saadi Sultanate
- Issue: Abdallah al-Ghalib II; Abdelmalik
Names
- Mohammed esh Sheikh el Mamun bin Ahmad al-Mansur
Era dates
- (16th–17th Centuries)
- Dynasty: Saadi Dynasty
- Father: Ahmad al-Mansur
- Mother: Elkheizourân
- Religion: Sunni Islam

Mohammed esh Sheikh el Mamun, also spelled Muhammad al-Shaykh al-Ma'mun (b. 1566–d. 1613), among other transliterations; also known as Abu Abdallah Mohammed III, ( Arabic: أبو العبدالله محمد سعدي الثالث) was a member of the Saadian dynasty who ruled parts of present-day Morocco during the succession conflicts within the dynasty between 1603 and 1627. He was the son of Sultan Ahmad al-Mansur by one of his harem slave concubines named Elkheizourân (some cite her name as Eldjauher). He was the full-brother of Abu Faris Abdallah and the half-brother of Zidan Abu Maali.

Muhammad al-Shaykh al-Ma'mun had been designated by his father, Ahmad al-Mansur, in 1579 and again in 1584 to be his successor. He was, however, also imprisoned by his father at some point for rebellion.

When Ahmad al-Mansur died in 1603, his two brothers refused to recognize him as the successor and immediately presented rival claims to the sultanate. Mainly, Zidan Abu Maali's party was stronger as his birthright was supported by the Mufti of Fez, Al Qassâr, and the Grand Qadi of Fez, Al Nuaim. They held Zidan Abu Maali as the rightful heir, as he was born to a legitimate wife of his father, Ahmad al-Mansur, whose birth they stated would always surpass in legitimacy that of the son of a harem slave concubine. It was during the reign of Muhammad al-Shaykh al-Ma'mun that the division of the Saadian realm arose: one part ruled from the main capital in Marrakesh, and the other from Fez in the north.

Control of both regions changed hands multiple times. In 1604, Muhammad al-Shaykh al-Ma'mun defeated his brother Zidan Abu Maali who was ruling from Fez, and thus he in turn ruled the northern part of Morocco until 1606 or later. His position quickly weakened, however, and he tried to obtain support first from Tuscany and then from Spain. In 1608, around the time that his brother Zidan Abu Maali reasserted himself in Marrakesh, he fled to Spain. There he signed a treaty with Philip III of Spain whereby he obtained military support in return for ceding the northern Moroccan port of Larache (al-ʿArāʾis̲h̲). He thus returned to Morocco with Spanish aid in November 1610 and forced at least some of the local leaders and officials in Fez to support him, under the threat of Spanish force. However, his concession of Larache to the Spanish quickly eroded his political support and also weakened the larger Saadian dynasty's prestige, resulting in local religious leaders and marabouts increasingly challenging Saadian rule. He was finally assassinated in 1613, after which his son Abdallah al-Ghalib II continued to rule in Fez.

== See also ==
- List of Kings of Morocco
- History of Morocco

Preceded by Ahmad al-Mansur	Saadi Dynasty; 1603–1608	Succeeded by Abdallah al-Ghalib II
