= Ahmad ibn Qasim al-Hajari =

Moroccan translator of Morisco origin

- Born: c. 1570; Andalusia
- Died: c. 1640; Tunis
- Occupations: Moroccan Ambassador to France and the Netherlands

Ahmad ibn Qāsim Al-Hajarī (Arabic: أحمد بن قاسم الحجري; c. 1570 – c. 1640), also known as Al-Hajari, Afoukay, Chihab, Afokai (Arabic: أفوكاي) or Afoqai (Arabic: أفوقاي), was a Muslim Morisco who worked as a translator in Morocco during the reigns of the Saadi sultans, Ahmad al-Mansur, Zidan Abu Maali, Abu Marwan Abd al-Malik II and Al Walid ibn Zidan. He was later sent as an envoy by Sultan Zidan Abu Maali of Morocco who sent him to France and Netherlands to negotiate the release of some Moriscos who were captured by privateers and thrown on the shores of the mentioned countries.

== Early life ==
Al-Hajari fled Spain for Morocco in 1599, following the persecutions of the Moriscos.

== France (1610–1611) ==
In 1610-11, the ruler of Morocco Mulay Zidan sent Al-Hajari to France in order to obtain redress on the subject of the Moriscos. He was involved in arms smuggling while in southern France, and visited Paris and Leiden. The reason for the visit to France seems to have been that some French corsairs, falsely offering a transit to Morocco to the Moriscos being expulsed from Spain after 1609, had instead captured them and their belongings. After sailing from Safi to Le Havre, Al-Hajari met with the King, and obtained a safe-conduct to visit the country. In Bordeaux he obtained some financial compensation from the shipowners who had been involved in the Moriscos affair.

=== Oriental studies ===
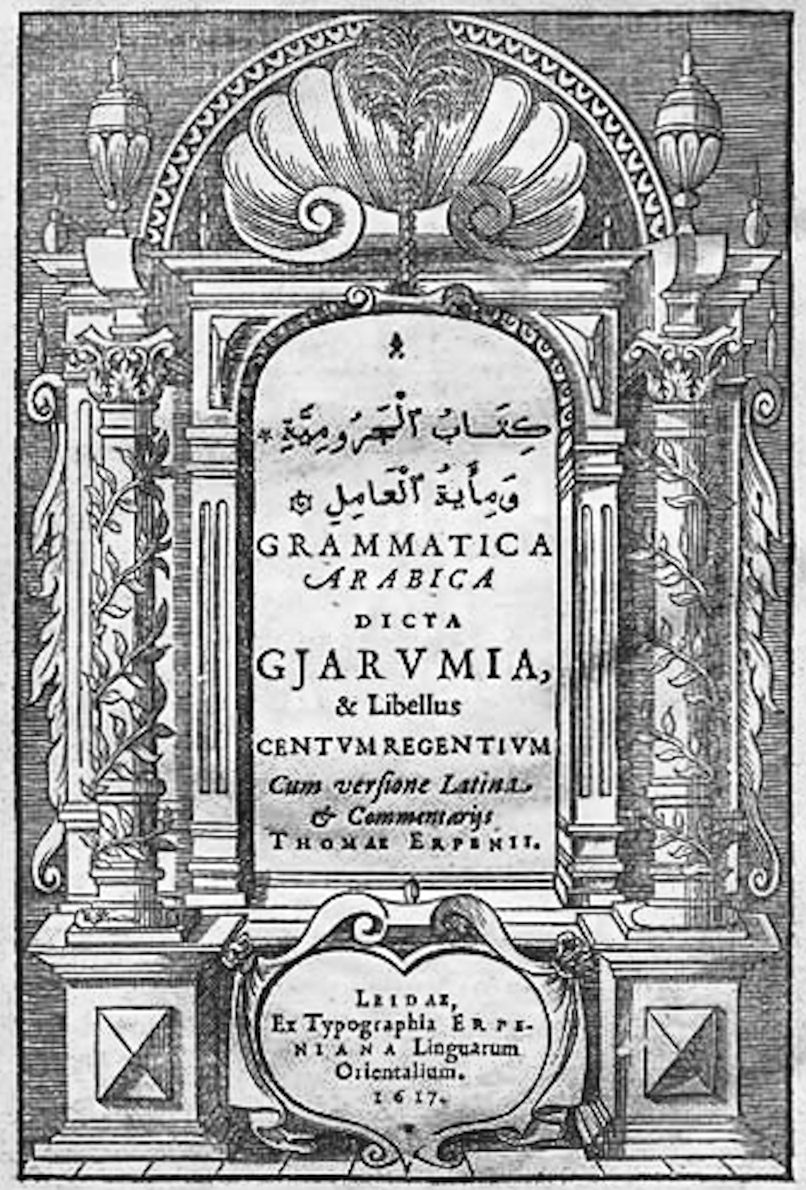
Thomas Erpenius received Lessons in Arabic grammar under al-Hajari. Then he wrote, Grammatica Arabica in 1617.

Al-Hajari met with the Orientalist Thomas Erpenius in September 1611 in Paris, and taught him some Classical Arabic. Through the introduction of Erpenius, Al-Hajari also met with the French Arabist Étienne Hubert d'Orléans, who had been a court physician for Moroccan ruler Ahmad al-Mansur in Marrakesh from 1598 to 1601. Etienne Hubert offered to help him in his proceeding and to represent him "to all people of authority". Erpenius described Al-Hajari as:

A civilized and intelligent man, who as a youth studied literature, and who even speaks moderately good Latin Arabic [Classical Arabic]

— Correspondence of Erpenius, September 1611.

They also discussed about religious subjects:

We have frequent discussions about religion, but believe me their discussions are not so easy to refute as many people imagine. They abhor especially the godhead of Christ (...) About many other things, they do not think as stupidly as some of us try to prove by means of the Quran.

— Correspondence of Erpenius, September 1611.

== Low-Countries (1613) ==
In 1613, Al-Hajari visited the Dutch Republic, which he could visit freely due to the existence of a Treaty of Friendship. He stayed from June to September. He met an old acquaintance, the former Dutch Consul in Morocco Pieter Marteen Coy. He also discussed with the Dutch Prince Maurice of Orange the possibility of an alliance between the Dutch Republic, the Ottoman Empire, Morocco and the Moriscos, against the common enemy Spain. His book mentions the discussion for a combined offensive on Spain, as well as the religious reasons for the good relations between Islam and Protestantism at the time:

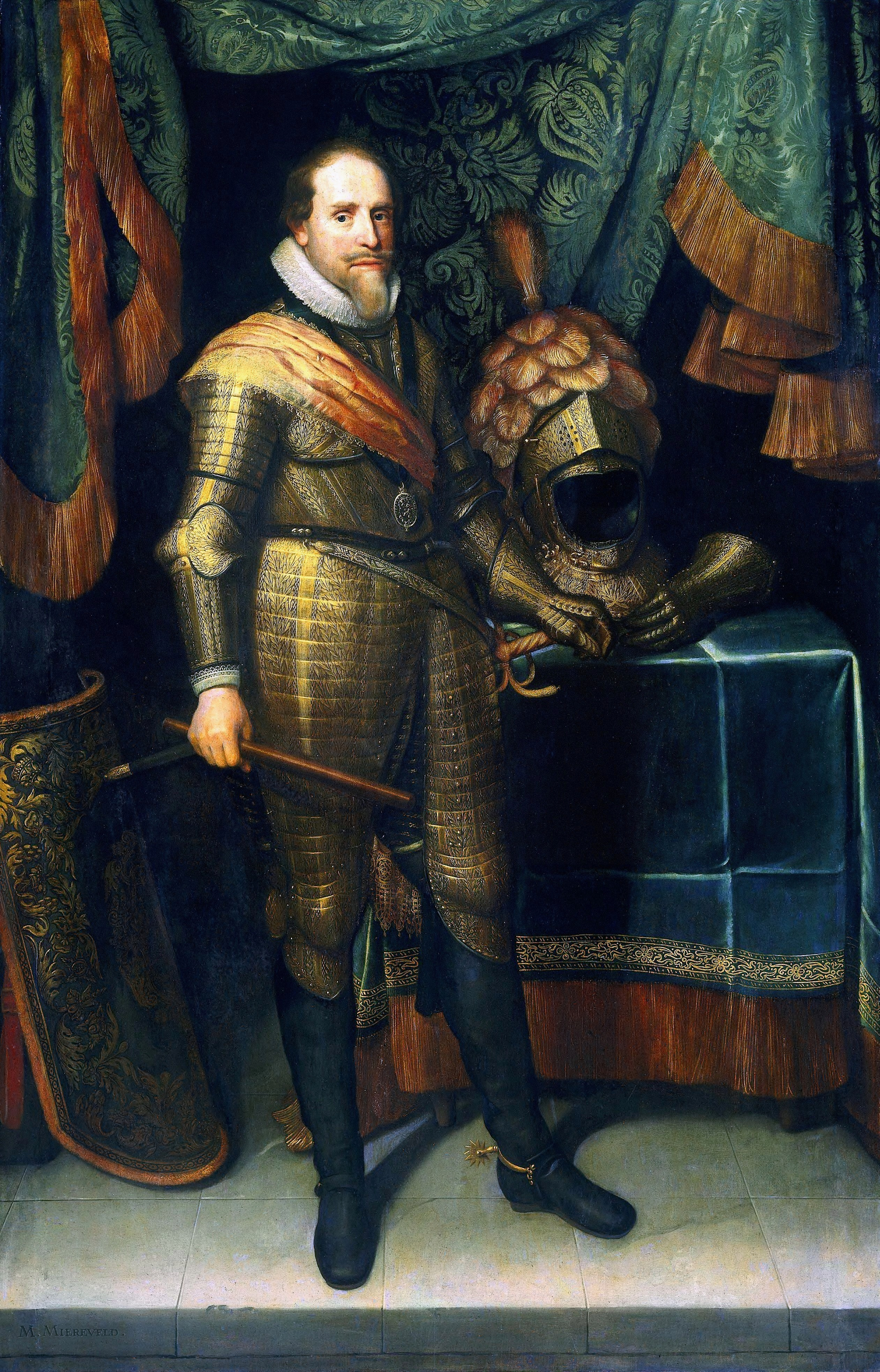
Al-Hajari discussed an alliance with Maurice of Orange.

Their teachers [Luther and Calvin] warned them [Protestants] against the Pope and the worshippers of Idols [referring to the Islamic view of Catholic image veneration]; they also told them not to hate the Muslims because they are the sword of God in the world against the idol-worshippers. That is why they side with the Muslims.

— Al-Hajari, The Book of the Protector of Religion against the Unbelievers

He then met with Erpenius there, as well as with the future explorer Peter Nuyts. In the series of Moroccan envoys to the Dutch Crown, Al-Hajari was preceded by Muhammad Alguazir, and succeeded by Yusuf Biscaino.

== Later life ==
The later part of his life was devoted to translating religious texts from Arabic to Spanish for the benefit of the Moriscos diaspora.

His importance lies in his chronicling of his journey which also contains a part on his fleeing the Inquisition with his family. His chronicles are titled: The supporter of religion against disbelievers and the unsheathed sword on heathens (Arabic: ناصر الدين على القوم الكافرين وهو السيف الأشهر على من كفر, Kitāb Nāṣir al-dīn ʻalā ʼl-qawm al-kāfirīn, also shortened to Kitāb Nāṣir al-dīn), which he authored in 1037 AH/1637 CE at the request of a Tunisian Cheikh.

He seems to have died in Tunis in the 1640s.

== See also ==
- Islam and Protestantism
