= Pieter Marteen Coy =

Pieter Maertensz Coy, also Pieter Coij or Pedro Marteen (died 1629), was a 17th-century diplomat of the Dutch Republic, active in Morocco and Algiers.

Not much is known of his life outside of his missions to Morocco and Algiers. He had worked as a merchant in Schiedam, where either his uncle or his brother had served as mayor.

In April–May 1605, Coy went from the Low Countries to Safi in Morocco and Algiers accompanied by 135 Muslim captives, both Turkish and Moorish, who had been seized by the Dutch in the Low Countries in a naval encounter with Spanish galleys. This event led to a first Dutch mission to Morocco led by Pieter Maertensz Coy.

From 1605, Coy became representative of the States General in Marrakesh.

In 1607 however, he was imprisoned by the Moroccan Sultan Mulay Zidan, following an incident in which Dutch pirates attacked English shipping. He was released on July 18, 1607, with the help of a local secretary to the Sultan, Al-Hajari.

Coy was recalled to the Netherlands on December 13, 1607. It took him two more years before the sultan allowed him to leave, travelling back to the Netherlands alongside a Moroccan mission of envoys in 1609.

He met the Moroccan envoy to the Netherlands Al-Hajari in La Hague in 1613, as recounted by the latter in his 1641 book The Book of the Protector of Religion against the Unbelievers.

Pieter Maertensz Coy arranged the encounter of Al-Hajari with Maurice of Nassau in 1613.

Coy was again nominated Dutch Consul in Algiers from 1626, where he succeeded Keyser, until his death in 1629. He died in Algiers.

== See also ==
- Morocco-Netherlands relations
