= Al-Masfiwi =

Al-Masfiwi (Arabic: الحسن بن أحمد المسفيوي) was a poet in the time of Ahmad al-Mansur.
