= Said Chaou =

Politician

- Born: 1967; Douar Mnoud, Al Hoceima province
- Occupation: Politician.
- Known for: MP for Al Ahd party. Calling for self-determination of the Rif region.

Said Chaou (Arabic: سعيد شوعو, born 1967), is a Moroccan-Dutch politician. He has been an MP in the Moroccan parliament between 2007 and 2010, before leaving the country in the same year and gradually becoming a vocal critic of the policy of King Mohammed VI. In late 2014, he joined the so-called 18 September movement, which calls for self-determination of the Rif region.

== Life and career ==
Said Chaou was born in Morocco and in 1985, he immigrated to the Netherlands with his family. Chaou admits that he had a number of entrepreneurial ventures in the Netherlands including owning a Cannabis coffeeshop between 1991 and 1998 in Roosendaal (City in Province of North Brabant, Netherlands). In 2003, Chaou settled in Morocco and was elected to the Moroccan house of representative in the legislative elections of 2007, representing the Al Ahd party. This period coincided with the creation of the "palace party" (the so-called Authenticity and Modernity Party PAM) by the kings senior advisor and close friend, Fouad Ali El Himma. The PAM tried to absorb a number of smaller parties, including the Al Ahd, and Chaou had unclear relations with this new political formation at the time, which was particularly active in the Rif region, especially considering that he's the cousin of the close associate of El Himma and current Secretary General of the PAM, Ilyas El Omari.

== Moroccan Diplomatic row with the Netherlands over the extradition of Chaou ==
On 21 March 2010, Chaou left Morocco and a few months later Morocco demanded his extradition for alleged participation in the "Hashish smuggling activities", an accusation which Chaou insists are cooked up charges on political backgrounds for his activities related to the creation of the PAM party. The Netherlands has so far refused to execute the demands of the Moroccans to extradite Chaou, and this culminated into a diplomatic crisis on 23 June, when the king Mohammed VI recalled his ambassador in the Netherlands immediately after a live Facebook broadcast by Chaou, in which he talked about the repression going on in the Rif region by the King's forces in response to the Hirak Rif protest movement. The Dutch response was that whilst it was committed to cooperation with the Moroccan government in strict respect of international law, it considered the reaction of the Moroccan government "incomprehensible and futile".
