= Abul Qasim ibn Mohammed al-Ghassani =

16th/17th-century Moroccan physician

Abul Qasim ibn Mohammed ibn Ibrahim al-Wazir al-Ghassani al-Andalusi (Arabic: قاسم بن محمد الغساني) (1548–1610) was a physician at the Saadian court. He studied medicine with his father. He lived in Marrakesh and Fez and was of Morisco descent. It is probable that he was the author of Hadiqat al-azhar fi mahiyyat al-ushb wa-l-aqqar (Garden of Flowers in the Explanation of the Character of Herbs and Drugs), a treatise on pharmacology and botany. A hospital in Fez was named after him.

He was sent by the Moroccan Sultan Mulay Zaidan as an envoy to the Low Countries. He was followed in this role by Al-Hajari, and later Yusuf Biscaino.

Muhammad Alguazir was also the author of an anti-Christian polemical work, Apología contra los artículos de la ley Cristiana, written at the order of Mulay Zaidan.
