= Yusuf Biscaino =

Moroccan writer

Yusuf Biscaino, also Ahmad b. Abd Allah al-Hayti al-Maruni (Arabic: أحمد بن عبدالله), was a Morisco in the service of the Moroccan Sultan Mulay Zidan.

He was sent as an ambassador to the Low Countries in 1610-11.

He met with Prince Maurice of Nassau who inquired to him about Islamic opinions on Jesus. He preferred not to answer on the spot, but later sent a letter to Maurice After returning to Marrakesh, Yusuf Biscaino sent the letter in Latin to Maurice in 1611, relying as a source on the work of Muhammad Alguazir.

== See also ==
- Morocco-Netherlands relations
