= Abu Faris Abdallah =

Saadi Dynasty ruler of parts of Morocco from 1603 to 1608

Saadi Sultan
- Reign: 1603 – 1608
- Predecessor: Ahmad al-Mansur
- Successor: Abdallah al-Ghalib II
- Born: c. 1564; Saadi Sultanate
- Died: c. 1608 (aged 43–44); Saadi Sultanate
- Abu Faris Abdallah bin Ahmad al-Mansur
Era dates
- (16th–17th Centuries)
- Dynasty: House of Saadi
- Father: Ahmad al-Mansur
- Mother: Elkheizourân
- Religion: Sunni Islam

Abu Faris Abdallah (Arabic: أبو فارس عبد الله السعدي), known as al-Wathiq Billah (1564 – 1608) was a Saadi dynasty ruler of some areas of Morocco. He was one of the sons of Ahmad al-Mansur and one of his harem slave concubines named al-kheizouran (some cite her name as Eldjauher). He ruled in the south of the country as well as Marrakesh and Fez between 1603 and 1608. He had numerous fights with his half-brother Zidan Abu Maali (r. 1603–1627).
