= Yusuf ibn Abu Dhaqn =

Yusuf ibn Abu Dhaqn, known to the West as Josephus Abudacnus or Josephus Barbatus, was an Egyptian Copt who traveled in Europe mainly teaching Arabic in the 17th century CE. He was born in Cairo around ?1570s CE and learned Greek and Turkish in Egypt. In 1595 he was sent to Rome with a letter from Pope Gabriel VIII of Alexandria to Pope Clement VIII, where he converted to Roman Catholicism and learned Italian and some ancient Greek and Latin. He also went to Paris and England. His Arabic skills, however, were limited as confessed by him to Scaliger and as confirmed later by Erpenius who studied under him. Erpenius, who had already learned some Arabic from William Bedwell, commented to his teacher that Barbatus had taught him 'many Arabic words' but of the 'corrupt language' that was spoken at the time 'by Egyptians and others', he wrote that today only the learned understood Arabic as spoken by the old. He also authored some books, the most well known of which is titled Historia Jacobitarum, seu Coptorum, in Aegypto, Libya, Nubia, Aethiopia, which is not strictly a history but an account of the Coptic liturgical rites of his time. The book was described by Edward Gibbon as being of low value.
