= Thomas van Erpe =

17th-century Dutch orientalist

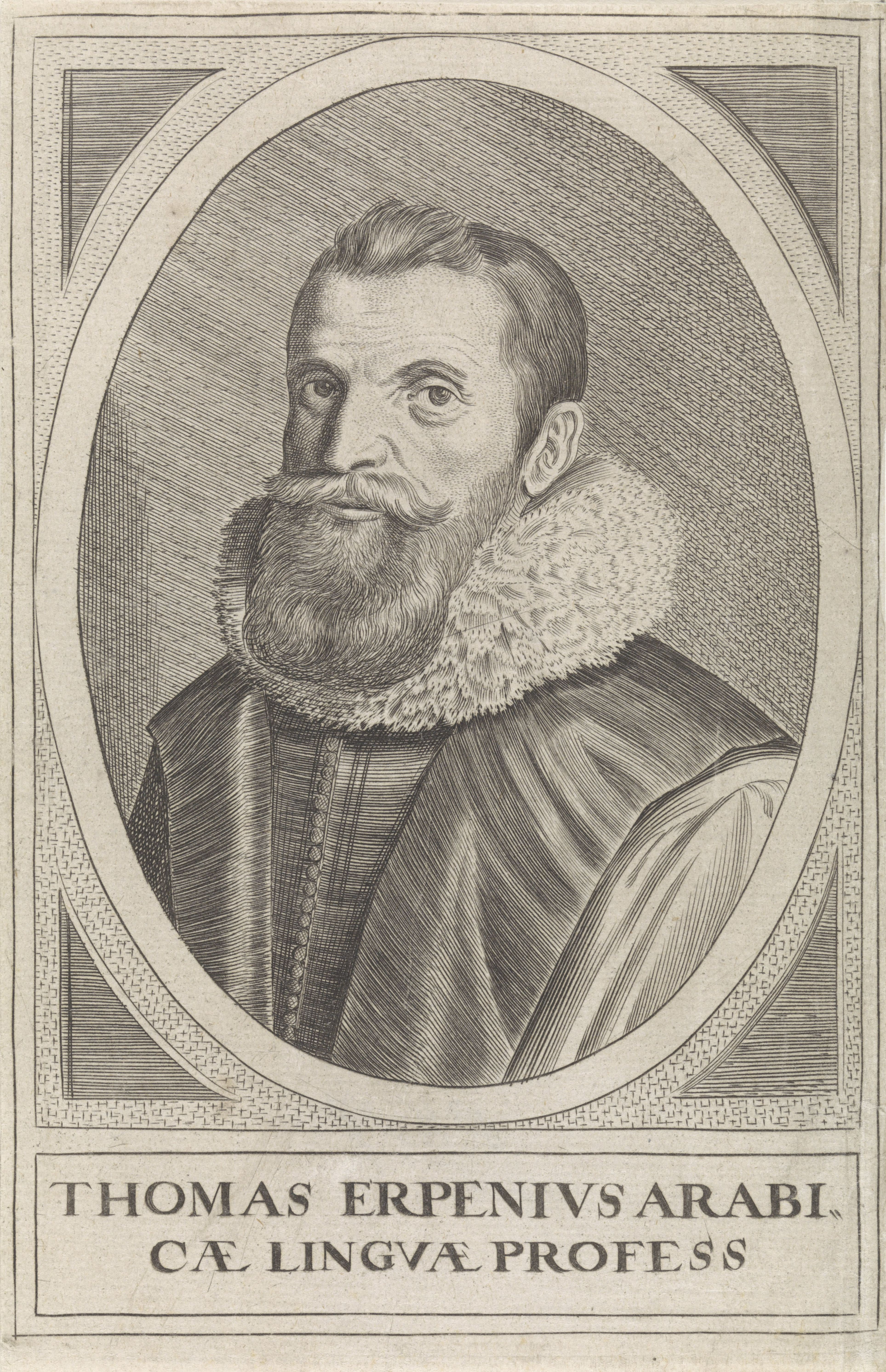
Thomas Erpenius

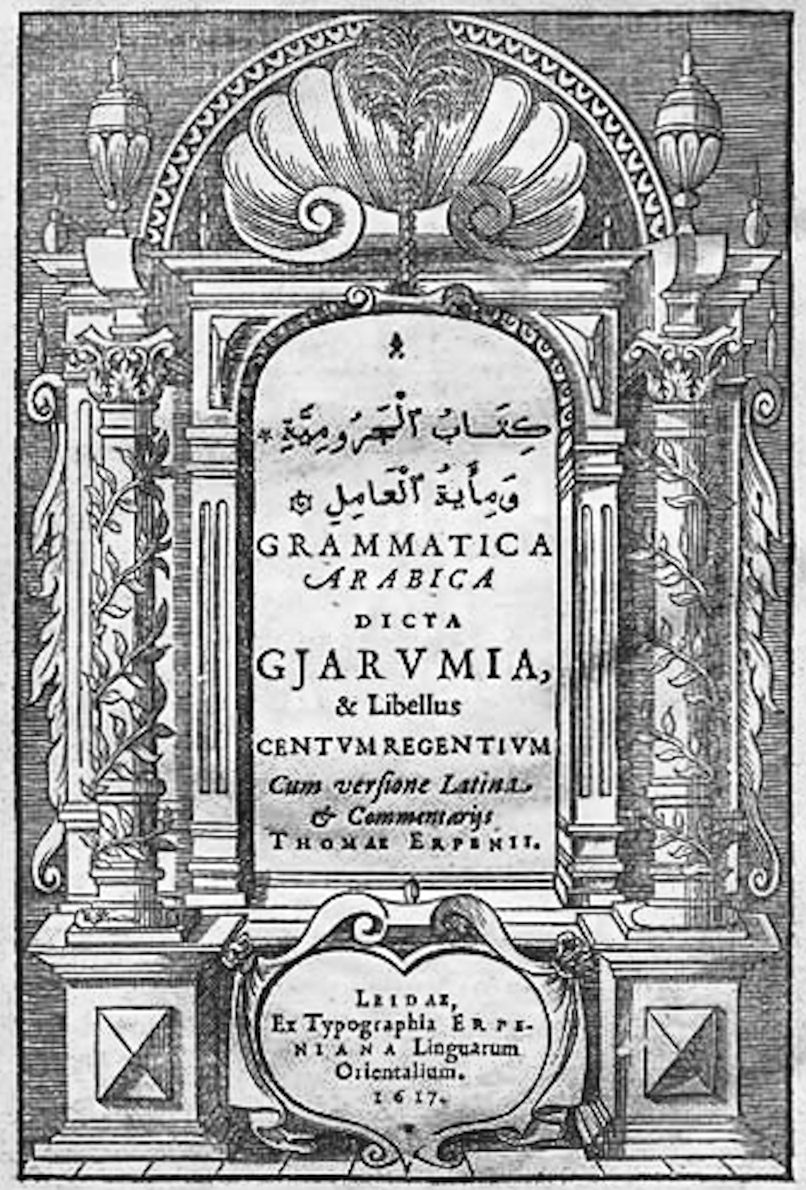
Erpenius, Grammatica Arabica, 1617

Thomas van Erpe, also known as Thomas Erpenius (September 11, 1584 – November 13, 1624), was a Dutch Orientalist, born in Gorinchem. He was the first European to publish an accurate book of Arabic grammar.

== Biography ==
After completing his early education in Leiden, he entered the university of that city, and in 1608 took the degree of master of arts. On the advice of Scaliger he studied Oriental languages whilst taking his course of theology. He afterwards travelled in England, France, Italy and Germany, forming connections with learned men, and availing himself of the information which they communicated. During his stay at Paris he contracted a friendship with Casaubon, which lasted during his life, and also took lessons in Arabic from an Egyptian, Joseph Barbatus, otherwise called Abu-dakni. However, given the limited knowledge Barbatus had in Arabic he later took lessons under the Moroccan diplomat of Andalusian origin Aḥmad ibn Qāsim Al-Ḥajarī who was in France on a mission.

At Venice he perfected his knowledge of the Turkish, Persic and Ethiopic languages. After a long absence, Erpenius returned to his own country in 1612, and in February 1613 he was appointed professor of Arabic and other Oriental languages, Hebrew excepted, in the University of Leiden. Soon after his settlement at Leiden, animated by the example of Savary de Brèves, who had established an Arabic press at Paris at his own charge, he caused new Arabic characters to be cut at a great expense, and erected a press in his own house.

In 1619 the curators of the university of Leiden instituted a second chair of Hebrew in his favour. In 1620 he was sent by the States of Holland to induce Pierre Dumoulin, or André Rivet, to settle in that country; and after a second journey he was successful in inducing Rivet to comply with their request. Some time after the return of Erpenius, the states appointed him their interpreter; and in this capacity he had the duty imposed upon him of translating and replying to the different letters of the Moslem princes of Asia and Africa.

His reputation had now spread throughout all Europe, and several princes, the kings of England and Spain, and the archbishop of Seville made him the most flattering offers; but he constantly refused to leave his native country. He was preparing an edition of the Qur'an with a Latin translation and notes, and was projecting an Oriental library, when he died prematurely on the 13 November 1624 in Leiden. His library of oriental books, papers and manuscripts, including six undated Malay manuscripts, was purchased by George Villiers, 1st Duke of Buckingham on behalf of Cambridge University and eventually transferred to Cambridge University Library in 1632 by the University Librarian Abraham Wheelocke.

Among his works may be mentioned his Grammatica Arabica (1748), published originally in 1613 and often reprinted; Rudimenta linguae Arabicae (1620); Grammatica Ebraea generalis (1621); Grammatica Chaldaea ac Syra (1628); and an edition of George Elmacin's Historia Saracenica, Arabice & Latine (History of the Saracens).
