= Ahmad al-Mansur =

7th Ruler of Saadi Dynasty

Abu al-Abbas Ahmad al-Mansur أبو العباس أحمد المنصور
- Caliph al-Dahabbi; Amir al-Muminin
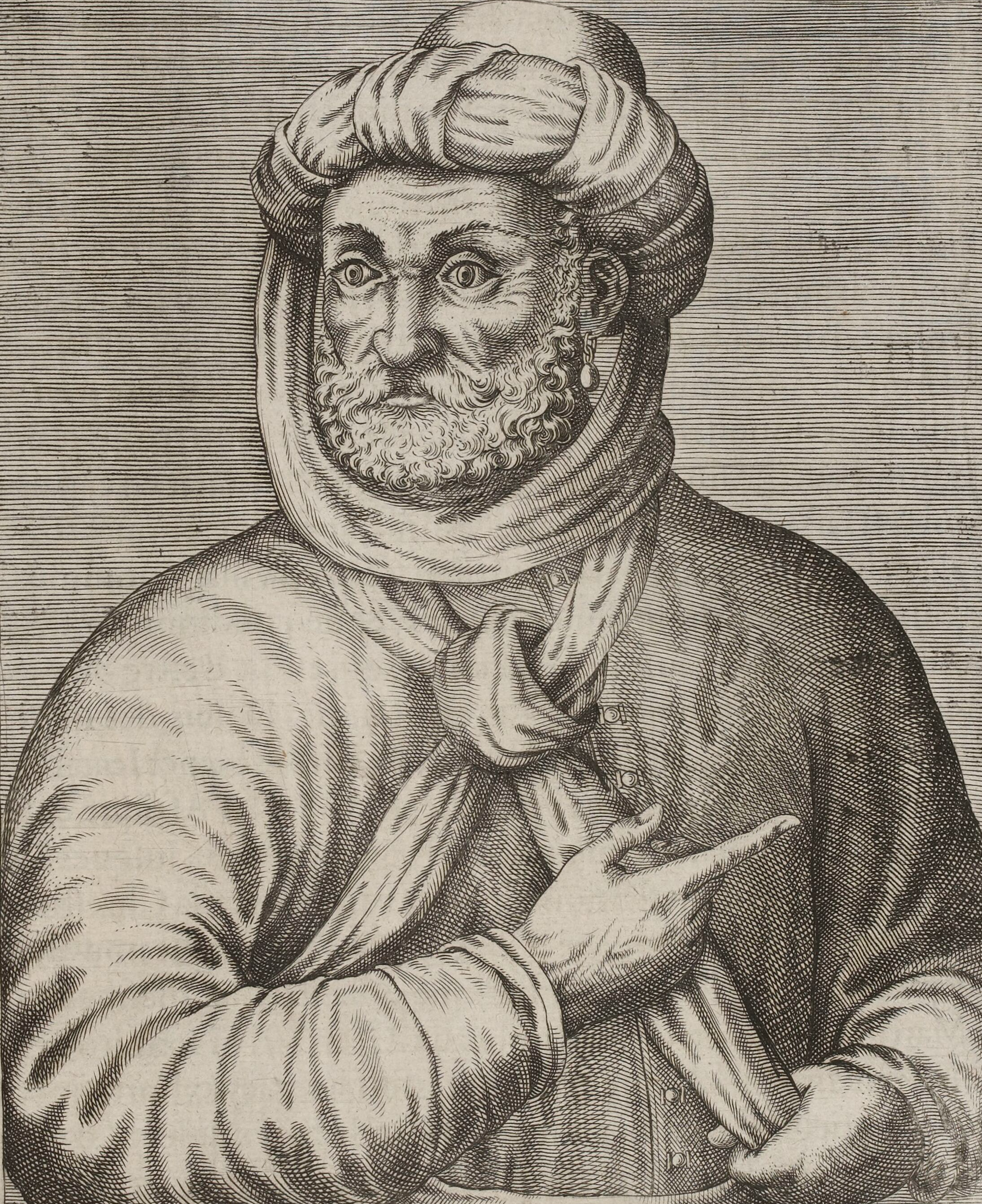
- A possible portrait of Ahmad al-Mansur, titled "Cherif roi de Fez et de Marroc", 1584

Sultan of Morocco
- Reign: 1578 – 1603
- Predecessor: Abd al-Malik I
- Successor: Civil War: Zidan al-Nasir (in Marrakesh); Abu Faris Abdallah (in Fez)
- Born: c. 1549; Fez, Saadi Sultanate
- Died: 25 August 1603 (aged 53–54); Fez, Saadi Sultanate
- Burial: Saadian Tombs, Marrakesh, Morocco
- Spouse: Lalla Mahalla bint Omar al-Marin; Lalla Aisha bint Abu Bakkar al-Shabani
- Issue: Zidan al-Nasir; Abu Faris Abdallah; Mohammed esh-Sheikh; Lalla Masouda; Abdelmalik; Lalla Safia; Seyyidat-Elmolouk
Names
- Ahmed al-Mansour bin Muhammad al-Sheikh bin Muhammad al-Qaim bi-Amr Allah al-Zaydani al-Hasani
Era dates
- (16th–17th Centuries)
- Arabic: أحمد المنصور بن محمد الشيخ بن محمد القائم بأمر الله الزيداني الحسني
- House: Saadi
- Father: Mohammed al-Shaykh
- Mother: Lalla Masuda al-Wizkitiya
- Religion: Sunni Islam

Ahmad al-Mansur (Arabic: أبو العباس أحمد المنصور بالله, romanized: Abū l-ʿAbbās Aḥmad al-Manṣūr biʾllāh; 1549 – 25 August 1603), also known as al-Dhahabī (Arabic: الذهبي, lit. 'the Golden') was the Saadi Sultan of Morocco from 1578 to his death in 1603, the sixth and most famous of all rulers of the Saadis. Ahmad al-Mansur was an important figure in both Europe and Africa in the sixteenth century. His powerful army and strategic location made him an important power player in the late Renaissance period. He has been described as "a man of profound Islamic learning, a lover of books, calligraphy and mathematics, as well as a connoisseur of mystical texts and a lover of scholarly discussions."

== Early life ==
Ahmad was the fifth son of Mohammed ash-Sheikh, who was the first Saadi sultan of Morocco. His mother was Lalla Masuda. After the murder of Mohammed in 1557 and the following struggle for power, two of his sons, Ahmad al-Mansur and Abd al-Malik, had to flee their elder brother Abdallah al-Ghalib (1557–1574), leave Morocco and stay abroad until 1576. The two brothers spent 17 years among the Ottomans between the Regency of Algiers and Constantinople, and benefited from Ottoman training and contacts with Ottoman culture. More generally, Ahmad al-Mansur "received an extensive education in Islamic religious and secular sciences, including theology, law, poetry, grammar, lexicography, exegesis, geometry, arithmetics, algebra, and astronomy."

=== Battle of Ksar el-Kebir and accession ===
In 1578, Ahmad's brother, Sultan Abu Marwan Abd al-Malik I, died in battle against the Portuguese army at Ksar-el-Kebir. Ahmad was named his brother's successor and began his reign amid newly won prestige and wealth from the ransom of Portuguese captives.

== Reign (1578–1603) ==
Al-Mansur began his reign by leveraging his dominant position with the vanquished Portuguese during prisoner ransom talks, thus collecting enough money to fill the Moroccan royal coffers. Shortly after, he commissioned the great architectural symbol of this new birth of Moroccan power, the El Badi Palace in Marrakesh, a huge and lavish riad-style palace which he used to receive ambassadors and to host celebrations. Construction began in December 1578 and was only finished in 1593 or 1594.

Eventually, the coffers began to run dry due to the great expense of supporting the military, extensive spy services, the palace and other urban building projects, a royal lifestyle and a propaganda campaign aimed at building support for his controversial claim to the Caliphate.

=== Relations with Europe ===
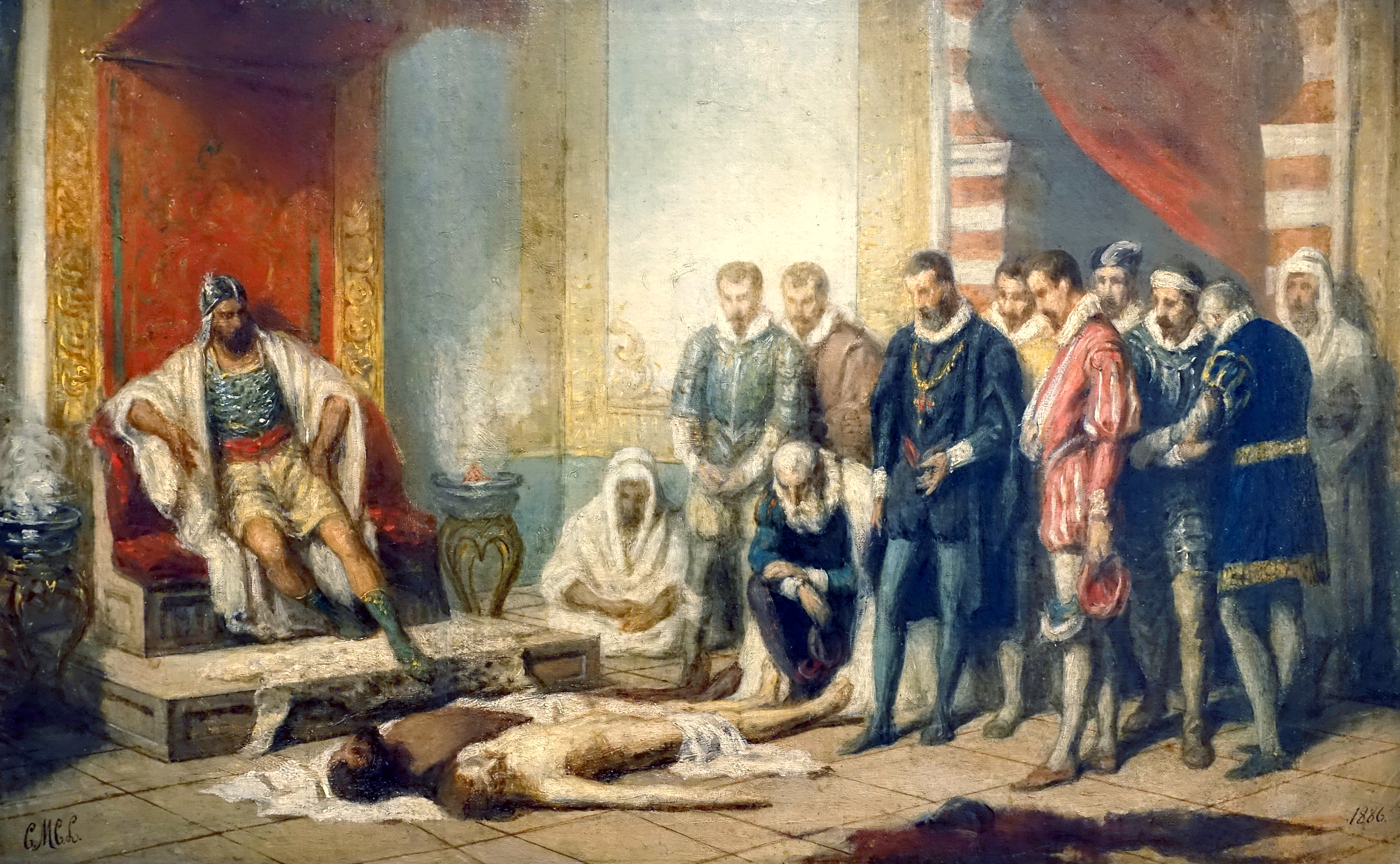
Recognition of the corpse of King Sebastian of Portugal before the Sultan of Morocco Ahmad al-Mansur, painting by Caetano Moreira de Costa Lima, 1886, oil in canvas

Morocco's standing with the Christian states was still in flux. The Spaniards and the Portuguese were seen as infidels, but al-Mansur knew that the only way his sultanate would thrive was to continue to benefit from alliances with other Christian economies.To do that, Morocco had to control sizeable gold resources of its own. Accordingly, al-Mansur was drawn irresistibly to the trans-Saharan gold trade of the Songhai in hopes of solving Morocco's economic deficit with Europe.

Al-Mansur developed friendly relations with England in view of an Anglo-Moroccan alliance. In 1600, he sent his Secretary Abd el-Ouahed ben Messaoud as ambassador to the Court of Queen Elizabeth I of England to negotiate an alliance against Spain.

Al-Mansur also wrote about reconquering al-Andalus for Islam from the Christian Spanish. In a letter dated 1 May 1601, he wrote that he also had ambitions to colonize the New World. He envisioned that Islam would prevail in the Americas and that the Mahdi would be proclaimed from the two sides of the oceans.

Al-Mansur had French physicians at his court. Arnoult de Lisle was physician to the sultan from 1588 to 1598. He was then succeeded by Étienne Hubert d'Orléans from 1598 to 1600. Both returned to France to become professors of Arabic at the Collège de France, and continued with their diplomatic endeavours.

=== Relations with the Ottoman Empire ===
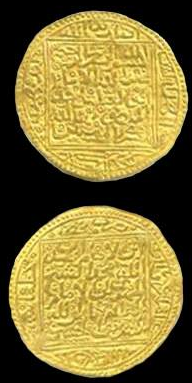
Gold dinar minted during the reign of Ahmad al-Mansur

Al-Mansur had ambivalent relations with the Ottoman Empire. At the very start of his reign, he formally recognized the suzerainty of the Ottoman sultan, as Abd al-Malik had done, while still remaining independent in practice.

Unlike Abd al-Malik, who won his battle with Ottoman support, Ahmad al-Mansur triumphed at the Battle of Wadi al-Makhazin without any Ottoman aid. His growing suspicion that the Ottomans had tried to assassinate him, especially since the earliest rebellions were carried out by figures with Ottoman ties, combined with his conviction that he was the Ottomans’ equal rather than a subordinate and indeed the rightful leader of the Islamic world, caused al-Mansur to believe that the Ottomans had taken caliphal authority away from Prophet's family.

All of the above led him to quickly alienate the Ottomans after he favorably received the Spanish embassy in 1579, who brought him lavish gifts, and then reportedly trampled the symbol of Ottoman suzerainty before a Spanish embassy in 1581. As a result, he minted coins in his own name and had Friday prayers and the khutba delivered in his name instead of in the name of Murad III, the Ottoman sultan.

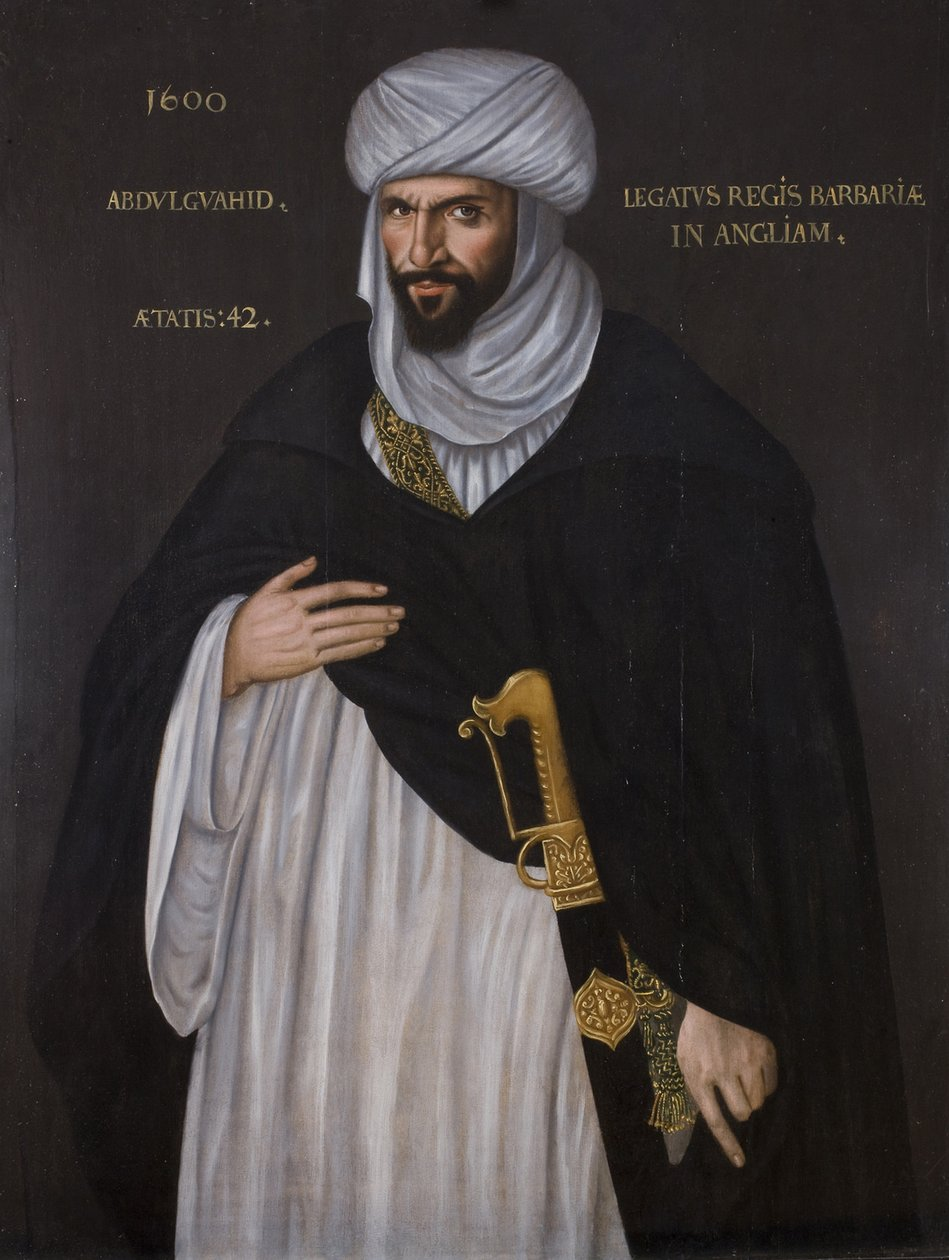
In 1600 Ahmad al-Mansur sent his Secretary Abd el-Ouahed ben Messaoud (pictured) as ambassador of Morocco to the court of Queen Elizabeth I of England to negotiate an alliance against Spain.

In response to the removal of his name from Friday prayers, Murad III began preparations for an attack on Morocco. After getting word of this, al-Mansur rushed to send an ambassador to Istanbul with sizeable gifts and the attack was cancelled. He paid a tribute of over 100,000 gold coins, agreed to show respect to the Ottoman sultan, and in return, was left alone. The embassy nearly failed to reach Istanbul due to the opposition of Uluç (later known as Kılıç Ali Paşa), the Ottoman Grand Admiral in Algiers who hoped to have Morocco invaded and incorporated into Ottoman Algeria's sphere of influence.

In 1582, al-Mansur was also forced to agree to a special Ottoman “protection” over Morocco and to pay a certain tribute in order to stop the attacks from Algerian corsairs on the Moroccan coast and on Moroccan ships. In 1583, the Saadian and Ottoman sultans even tentatively discussed a joint military operation against the Spanish in Oran. Al-Mansur enjoyed peaceful relations with the Ottoman Empire afterwards and respected its sovereignty, but also played the Ottomans and European powers against each other and issued propaganda that undermined the Ottoman sultan's claim as leader of all Muslims. He continued to send a payment to Istanbul every year, which the Saadians interpreted as a "gift" to the Ottomans, while the Ottomans considered it a "tribute".

In 1587 Uluç died and a change in the Ottoman administration in Algiers limited the power of its governors. After this, tensions between the two states further decreased, while the Saadian government further stabilized and its independence became more entrenched. Al-Mansur even felt confident enough after 1587 to drop his regular payments to Murad III. Despite the limits of his power, he officially proclaimed himself caliph in the later part of his reign, seeing himself as rival, rather than subordinate, of the Ottomans, and even as the rightful leader of the Muslim world.

== Conquests ==
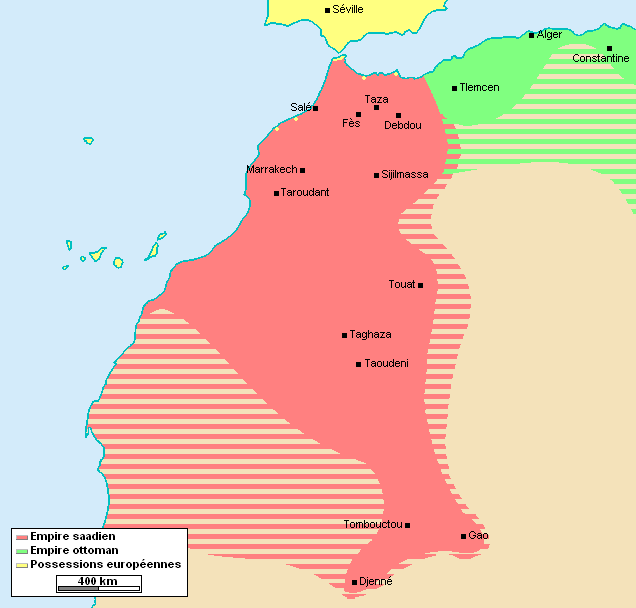
Extent of Saadian territory during the reign of Ahmad al-Mansur

=== Annexation of Saharan oases ===
In 1583, the dispatch of al-Mansur was led by the commanders Abu Abdullah Muhammad bin Baraka and Abu Al-Abbas Ahmed Ibn Al-Haddad Al-Omari. The march of the army began from Marrakesh, and they arrived after 70 days, initially calling for obedience and warning. After the tribal elders refused to comply, war began. The annexed territories included Tuat, Jouda, Tamantit, Tabelbala, Ourgla, Tsabit, Tekorareen, and others.

=== Annexation of Chinguetti ===
The Saadians repeatedly tried to control Chinguetti, and the most prominent attempts were made during the reign of Sultan Muhammad al-Shaykh, but control of it did not come until the reign of Ahmed al-Mansur, who stripped a campaign in 1584 led by Muhammad bin Salem in which he managed to seize control of Chinguetti, in modern day Mauritania.

=== Songhai campaign ===
The Songhai Empire was a West African state centered in eastern Mali. From the early 15th to the late 16th century, it was one of the largest African empires in history. On October 16, 1590, Ahmad took advantage of the recent civil strife in the empire and dispatched an army of 4,000 men across the Sahara desert under the command of converted Spaniard Judar Pasha. Though the Songhai met them at the Battle of Tondibi with a force of 40,000, they lacked the Moroccans’ gunpowder weapons and quickly fled. Ahmad advanced, sacking the Songhai cities of Timbuktu and Djenné, as well as the capital Gao. Despite these initial successes, the logistics of controlling a territory across the Sahara soon grew too difficult, and the Saadians lost control of the cities not long after 1620.

== Legacy ==
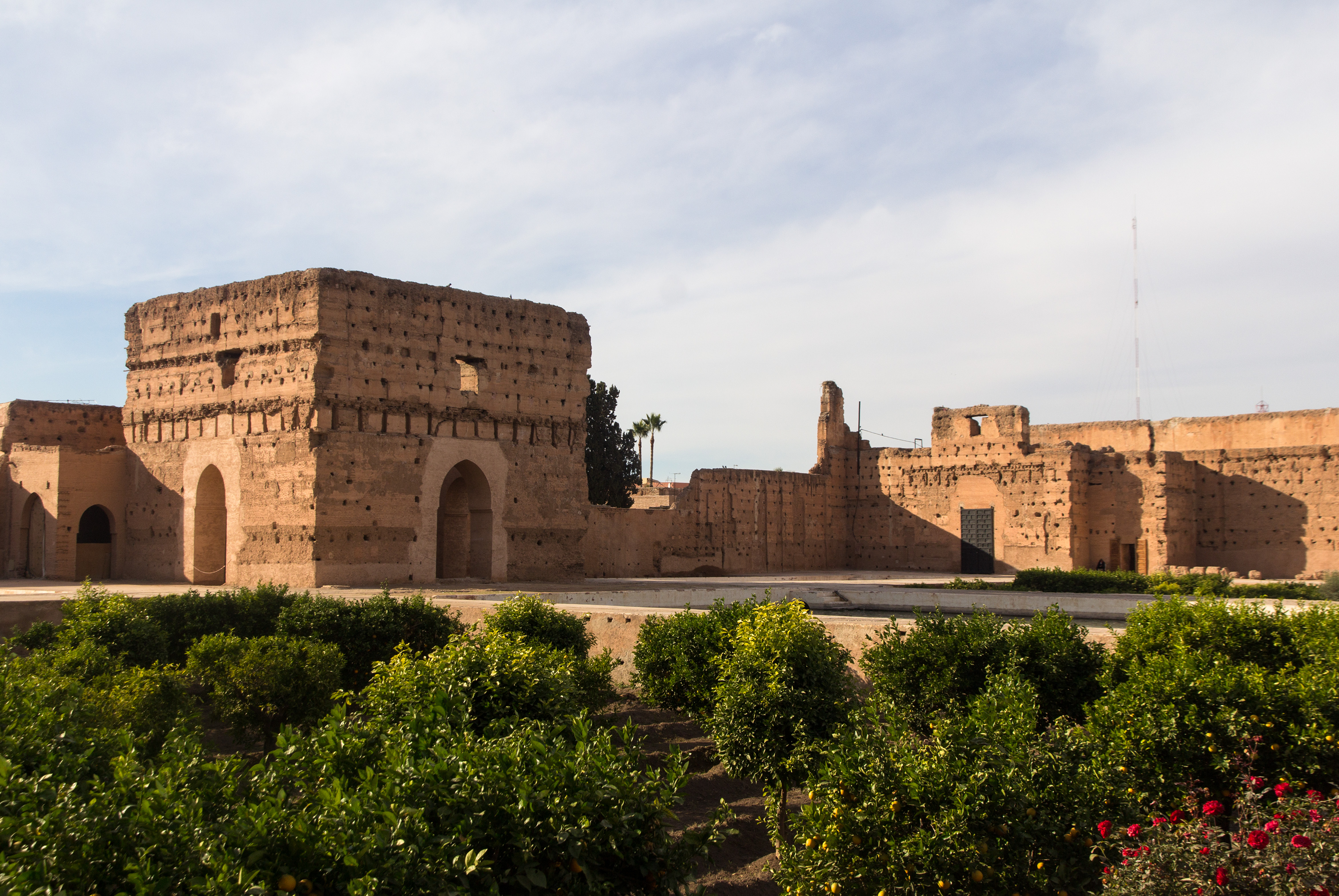
El Badi Palace in Marrakesh, begun by al-Mansur in 1578

Ahmad al-Mansur died in 1603 and was succeeded by his son Zidan al-Nasir, who was based in Marrakesh, and by Abou Fares Abdallah, who was based in Fez, having only local power. He was buried in the mausoleum of the Saadian Tombs in Marrakesh. Well-known writers at his court were Ahmed Mohammed al-Maqqari, Abd al-Aziz al-Fishtali, Ahmad Ibn al-Qadi and Al-Masfiwi.

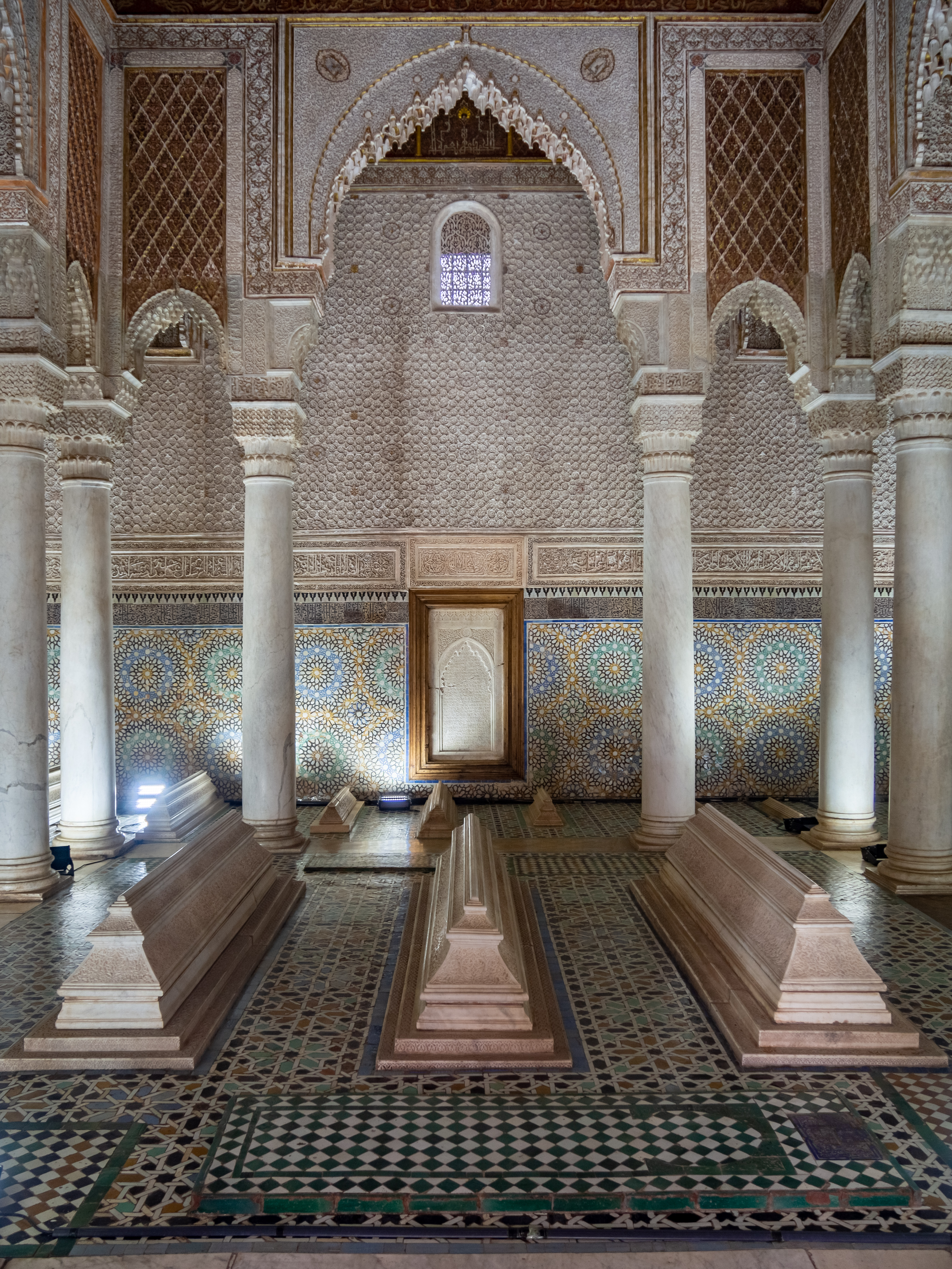
Mausoleum chamber of Ahmad al-Mansur in the Saadian Tombs

Through astute diplomacy, al-Mansur resisted the demands of the Ottoman sultan to preserve Moroccan independence. al-Mansur excelled in the art of the balancing of power through diplomacy, playing the Europeans and Ottomans against one another. Eventually, he spent far more than he collected in revenue. He attempted to expand his holdings through conquest, and although initially successful in their military campaign against the Songhai Empire, the Moroccans found it increasingly difficult to maintain control over conquered locals as time went on. Meanwhile, as the Moroccans continued to struggle in Songhai, their power and prestige on the world stage declined significantly.

Al-Mansur was one of the first authorities to take action on smoking, in 1602, towards the end of his reign. The ruler of the Saadi dynasty used the religious tool of fatwas (Islamic legal pronouncements) to discourage the use of tobacco.

The royal library which he founded, known as the Zaydani Library, was eventually stolen from Sultan Zidan Abu Maali by French pirates and was taken to Spain, where most of it burned in an accidental fire.

=== Popular culture ===
- al-Mansur is featured as the playable leader of the Moroccan civilization in the 2013 computer strategy game Civilization V: Brave New World.

== Bibliography ==
- Davidson, Basil (1995), Africa in history : themes and outlines, New York: Simon & Schuster, ISBN 0-684-82667-4.
- Mouline, Nabil (2009), Le califat imaginaire d'Ahmad al-Mansûr, Presses Universitaires de France.
- Smith, Richard L. (2006), Ahmad al-Mansur: Islamic Visionary, New York: Pearson Longman, ISBN 0-321-25044-3.

| Preceded by Abd al-Malik I | Sultan of Morocco; 1578–1603 | Succeeded by Zidan al-Nasir |
