= Lalla Aisha Mubarka =

Concubine of Moulay Ismail of Morocco

Lalla Aisha Al Mubaraka (Arabic: عائشة بنت مبارك الرحماني), often referred to as Zaydana (died 1716), was a slave concubine of Moulay Ismail of Morocco (r. 1672–1727), and later became one of his four wives. She had an acknowledged influence over the affairs of state through her personal influence over the sultan. Some Europeans are even said to have called her the "Empress of Morocco" as a result.

== Life ==
=== Identity ===
Lalla Aisha's real identity is subject to conflicting reports from historic sources and there are multiple theories regarding her origins. Some identify her as a black slave, others as a princess and some as a Barbuchi. Reports from European slaves at the court of Sultan Moulay Ismail identify her as a black slave concubine. Moroccan historians do not give account of her origins nor of her status as wife, but refer to her as "the noble Lalla Aisha Al Mubaraka". Al Nâsiri and Al Zayani both refer her as such.

Other studies identify her as the "Princess of Tuat", in the 17th century the Aït Atta were the tribe who lead the Emirate of Tuat before Sultan Sidi Mohammed of Tafilalet conquered the Emirate in 1652. Lalla Aisha's brother was Ali ben Atta, one of the Caids (Major) of Guich Al Udaya. As in the first half of the 17th century the Atta were the tribe who lead the Emirate of Tuat, if she was truly the Princess of Tuat it would make sense that her brother would bear as a part of his surname "Atta" as himself being filiated to the Aït Atta.

The third explanation of her origins cites Lalla Aisha as a Barbuchi, it is not precised if she is of the slave cast of this tribe. Some sources identify her as a woman born as Aisha bint Mubarak El Rehmani Al Berabuchi, in the Royal court of her husband Sultan Moulay Ismail she was surnamed the Udaya Queen. From Moroccan historians we know her as Lalla Aisha Al Mubaraka, therefore regarding the conventional Arabic patronymic surname, her father's name is Mubarak. In this theory her being surnamed the Udaya Queen is credited to the powerful Guich Al Udaya created in the late 1670s by Sultan Moulay Ismail. As further explanation, the Beidane society was (before the 20th century) led by the armed aristocracy called the Awlad Hassān. Two of the sons of Hassān are identified to be: Rehman and Uday. The first, also the eldest, is the ancestor of the Barbuchi. The Udayas as spelled in Guich Al Udaya do not concern the family name but the confederation of given Hassāni tribes. Guich Al Udaya thus include the following tribes: M'gharfa, the eponymous Udaya and Barbuchi. This explains why in this last theory Moroccan sources and European slaves at the court of Moulay Ismail refer to her as the Udaya Queen.

=== Marriage & children ===
Historic sources stipulate that Lalla Aisha also known as Zaydana was purchased for sixty ducats from Moulay Rashid to become a member of Moulay Ismail's harem as a slave concubine.

In accordance with Islamic law, the Sultan was allowed to have a harem of slave concubines in addition to his four wives, as long as the concubines were slaves. However, despite the fact that the sultans normally only married women from prominent families such as the Sharif families, Moulay Ismail formally married Zaydana. Sultan Moulay Ismail had thousands of slave concubines in his harem and hundreds of children, along with Lalla Aisha he had three additional legal wives: Lalla Halima Al Sufyaniyah, Lalla Umm al-Iz at-Taba and Lalla Khanatha bint Bakkar.

Zaydana managed to achieve a great emotional bond with Sultan Moulay Ismail, and thereby gain influence over the entire kingdom. She has been referred to in some European reports as the "Empress of Morocco", which is not to be taken literally. The Europeans often referred to the Sultan as "Emperor" or "King" rather than "Sultan", and to the Sultan's consorts as "Empress" or "Queen", which was the equivalent titles of their own rulers and their own ruler's wives; and whenever a woman entered the harem of the Sultan they referred to it as a "marriage", even when this may simply have been slave concubinage. The habit of European translators to equalize local customs to their own equivalents in this way may have caused confusion. In reality, there was no equivalent of an Empress consort or a Queen consort at a Muslim court, were the ruler could have many wives and concubines, and the first royal consort to bear an official title in Morocco is Lalla Salma.

Zaydana had several children with Sultan Moulay Ismail, among them:

- Prince Moulay Mohammed Zaydan (1672–1708),
- Sultan Moulay Ahmed,
- Sultan Moulay Ali.

According to John Braithwaite although Moulay Ahmed was two years younger than his half-brother Moulay Abdelmalik, he was chosen by his father as successor. Despite having multiple sons with her husband, Lalla Aisha's sons' reigns were short lived as it was Sultan Moulay Abdallah who managed to sustainably win the throne and his son Sidi Mohammed III reigned after him.

=== Influence ===
The French Dominican friar Dominique Busnot described her as an enormous, tall and fat black woman who somehow managed to acquire such influence over the sultan that she could often deal with him as she wished. To explain her influence, many Moroccans called her a witch.

Zaydana staged intrigues and plots to have her own son Moulay Mohammed Zaydan (1672–1708) named successor before Moulay Muhammad al-Alim, who was the son of a Spanish concubine. She claimed that he was preparing a coup to conquer the throne. While this was not initially true, he was in 1704 provoked to actually do so, after which he was captured by Moulay Zaydan in July of that year. He committed suicide in 1706 after his father had one of his hands and one of his feet amputated as punishment. As Zaydana planned, Moulay Ismail had her own son replace him as governor of Taroudant. However, in October 1708, her son was murdered by his concubines at Taroudant. Moulay Zaydan was said to be a drunk. It has been suggested that the two women accused of the killing were actually following orders from the sultan, he wanted to get rid of his unworthy son who had massacred the civilian population of Taroudant. Moulay Ismail did not dare to tell Zaydana and acted in secret, she subsequently had the two women executed. Moulay Zaydan was buried in the Moulay Muhammad al-Alam Mausoleum at Meknes.

Historic sources state that after the death of her older son, she fell into oblivion. It is widely believed that part of the motive for her disgrace was that she pushed her step-son, Moulay Mohammed al-Alim's revolt in 1703. The rebellion caused atrocities, with Marrakesh and Taroudant civilian population massacred on various criminal acts unsponsored by Moulay Ismail, which wouldn't have happened if her machinations were not pushed to the extreme. Moulay Ismail initially forgave her when she violated his seal on an initial trinket to dishonor Moulay Mohammed al-Alim and have her son as heir.

Zaydana died in 1716. A report made by a Spanish captive called Joseph de Leon alleged that Ismail Ibn Sharif was strangled by his "concubine" Zaydana. This is clearly libelous however, as Ismail Ibn Sharif lived for over a decade after Zaydana died.
