= Khanatha bint Bakkar =

Wife of Sultan Moulay Ismail (c.1668–1754)

خناثة بنت بكار Lalla Khanatha bint Bakkar
- Princess
- Born: c.1668
- Died: 1754 (aged 85–86)
- Burial: Moulay Abdallah Mosque's Royal Necropolis; Fes el-Jdid, Morocco
- Spouse: Sultan Moulay Ismail (m. 1678; died 1727)
- Issue: Moulay Mohammed; Moulay Hafiz; Moulay Mehrez; Moulay Mohammed al-Mutais; Sultan Moulay Abdallah
- House: Brakna (by birth); Alaouite (by marriage)
- Father: Sheikh Abu Bakkar al-Ghul bin Ali al-Mghafri
- Religion: Islam

Lalla Khanatha bint Bakkar (Arabic: خناثة بنت الشيخ بكار المغافري, romanized: Khunātha bint Shaykh Bakkār al-Mghāfrī) (1668–1754), was one of the wives of Sultan Moulay Ismail (r. 1672–1727), and acted as his de facto First Minister and Secretary. After his death, she remained active in the political governance of Morocco during the unstable situation which followed as the mother of Sultan Moulay Abdallah (r. 1729–1757).

== Life ==
=== Origin and marriage ===
Lalla Khanata's full name was Khanatha bint Sheikh Abu Bakar al-Gul bin Ali bin Abdallah.

She was born to the chieftains of the M'gharfa tribe, part of the Awlad Hassān caste among the Beidanes. The Awlad Hassān were the armed aristocratic caste of the Beidane people and her family of the Awlad Abdalla clan in the M'gharfa tribe. Her father was the Grand Sheikh Abu Bakkar Al M'gharfi, the chieftain of the M'gharfa tribal confederation.

She has also been claimed to be the daughter of the Emir of Brakna. However, historic chronicles record Lalla Khanatha as hailing from Sbouya in Oued Noun. Most likely, she was confused with the Brakna princess who appeared before Moulay Ismail in 1690. The historic confusion resided because this princess, perhaps Nassira el-Salwi, is Lalla Khanatha's distant cousin, as hailing from the Oulad Mbarek Hassāns, cousins of the M'gharfa.

She married Moulay Ismail in 1678 and became a Princess henceforth. Her marriage happened when that very year, Sultan Moulay Ismail led a Saharan expedition to counter the influence of his rebellious nephew, Moulay Ahmed ben Mehrez, who had proclaimed himself Emir of Sous in the mid-1670s. His goal was to encircle him to the point of an embargo. Thus, he circled from the Souss (here meaning the Sahara) and the oasis of Touat to the provinces of Sakia El Hamra, there the Sultan received embassies from the M'ghafra tribe and allegiance from Grand Sheikh Abu Bakkar Al M'gharfi, the chieftain. The latter gave his daughter, Khanatha, as bride to the Sultan, to seal his tribe's allegiance. A later version of the events claim that it was following his expedition to Souss and the oasis of Touat to the provinces of Chenguit (in Adrar) on the border of the Sudan region in modern Mauritania, that Moulay Ismail received embassies from all the Maqil tribes populating the Saharan provinces of the country. And to seal their allegiance, Khanatha bint Bakkar was given to him as his bride.

=== Reign of Sultan Moulay Ismail ===
Moulay Ismail had thousands of slave concubines in his harem, four legal wives he constantly replaced by divorce and hundreds of children. At some point around 1708 his wedded wives were simultaneously: Khnata bent Bakkar herself, Halima Al Sufyaniyah, Lalla Aisha Al Mubaraka and Lalla Umm al-Iz at-Taba. Lalla Khnata and Sultan Moulay Ismail issued children together, among them Sultan Moulay Abdallah.

Khnata bent Bakkar was famous for her beauty, intelligence, and learning. She devoted herself to private study in the palace, and came to be regarded as learned within both Islam and the sciences.

She came to be one of the favorites of her husband, and as such in a position of influence. She was one of the few people from which Moulay Ismail took advice.

She acted as de facto First Minister and Secretary for her husband. In 1721, she acted as a mediator between the Sultan and the British ambassador Charles Stewart, during the negotiations about a peace treaty between Morocco and Great Britain, which was successfully completed in 1722 with her assistance. However, contemporary sources cite Lalla Umm al-Iz at-Taba as the mediator since the author of the correspondence signed her name, implying she authored it. The confusion residing in Charles Stewart addressing her as "Powerful Lady, Mother of Muley Abdallah" and both women have a son bearing that name. To dissipate the confusion, Lalla Khnata's son, the future Sultan Moulay Abdallah frequently signed "Muley Abdallah ould Khanatha bint Bakkar" on legal paper, meaning "Muley Abdallah son of Khanatha bint Bakkar".

=== Mother of the Sultan ===
Sultan Moulay Ismail died in 1727. After his death, there followed a period of internal turmoil, in which her husband's ten sons with various wives and concubines competed with each other for power. She supported her own son Sultan Moulay Abdallah and wielded great power and influence in his government during his reign. She was appointed Foreign affairs minister in his government and has been referred to as the first woman in Morocco in such a position. Her perhaps biggest contribution was as a diplomat, as she successfully acted as the mediator between her son and his competitors and half brothers during the succession crisis. She has been credited with having led Morocco out of the instability of succession war back to stability.

She also wrote a commentary of Al-Isaba fi Marifat as-Sabaha, a book which authored by Ibn Hajar al-Asqalani, and also several letters to the inhabitants of Oujda, advising and consoling them on their plight as neighbors of the Ottoman Turks.

She was buried in the Royal Mausoleum at Fez al-Jadid.

== Descendance ==
From their mariage, Lalla Khanatha and Moulay Ismail had several children. Among them are:

- Moulay Mohammed (c. 1679-1704), the eldest of her children;
- Moulay Hafiz, born in the 1680s he died in 1704 in Fez;
- Moulay Mehrez, he died in 1726;
- Moulay Mohammed al-Mutais, he died in 1704;
- Sultan Moulay Abdallah (1694-1757), he is the father of Sultan Sidi Mohammed III.

== Legacy ==
=== Tributes ===
In Kitâb Elistiqsâ, the author Al-Nasiri gave tribute to Lalla Khnata on the date of her death:

"On 6 djoumâda I, died the noble lady Khenâtsa Elmgafriya, daughter of Bekkâr and mother of the Sultan (God have mercy on her!) who was a woman well versed in science and literature. She was buried in the cemetery of Sharifs in Fes Eljedid."

— Ahmad ibn Khalid al-Nasiri, ... [Le livre de la recherche approfondie des événements des dynasties de l'extrême Magrib], vol. IX : Chronique de la dynastie alaouie au Maroc (1906)

In Casablanca, in tribute to her person, a private high school Collège Khnata Bent Bakkar bears her name.

=== In culture ===
The novel, La Reine Khanatha, épouse de Mawla Ismail, by Amna Ellouh (thanks to which she won the Moroccan Prize for Literature in 1954).
