= Dar Dbibegh =

- دار دبيبغ
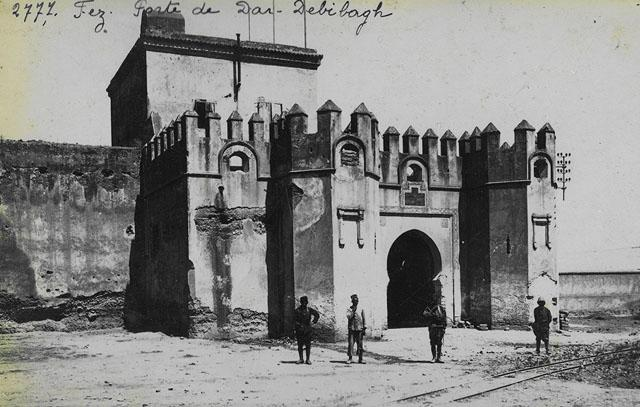
- Front gate of Dar Dbibegh in a 1920s photograph

General information
- Type: fort
- Architectural style: 'Alawi, Moroccan
- Location: Fez, Morocco
- Completed: 1729

Dar Dbibegh (Arabic: دار دبيبغ ; also spelled Dar Dbibagh or Dar Debibagh) was a historic kasbah or fortified palace located in the countryside near Fez, Morocco. It was built in 1729 by the 'Alawi sultan Mawlay Abdallah, who ruled Morocco intermittently between 1729 and 1757. Located in the plains a few kilometers south of the old city, it consisted of a walled enclosure which contained a large country house, gardens, and a small mosque. The palace was also used initially by the troops of French Colonel Charles Émile Moinier when he arrived in Fez in 1911, ahead of the establishment of the French protectorate in Morocco, and remained a military post after 1912. Today its location is occupied by the modern Ville Nouvelle ("New City") of Fez, which is also called Dar Dbibegh by Moroccans as a result.
