= Abu'l Abbas Ahmad of Morocco =

Sultan of Morocco (1677–1729)

Moulay Ahmad Dehbi

Sultan of Morocco
- Reign: 1727 – 1728
- Predecessor: Ismail Ibn Sharif
- Successor: Abdalmalik
- Reign: 1728 – 1729
- Predecessor: Abdalmalik
- Successor: Abdallah
- Born: 1677; Meknes, Morocco
- Died: 5 March 1729 (aged 51–52); Meknes, Morocco
- Burial: Mausoleum of Moulay Ismail, Meknes
- House: Alaouite dynasty
- Father: Ismail Ibn Sharif
- Mother: Lalla Aisha Al Mubaraka

Mulay Ahmed Dehbi (Arabic: أحمد الذهبي بن إسماعيل) (also spelt Moulay Ahmad ad Dahabi), known fully as 'Abul Abbas Mulay Ahmad ud-Dhahabi bin Ismail as-Samin (1677 – 5 March 1729), was the Sultan of Morocco in 1727–1728 and 1728–1729.

He was born at Meknes in 1677, as a son of Ismail Ibn Sharif. Between 1699 and 1700 he was the Khalifa of Tadla. He ascended the throne on 22 March 1727, after his father's death.

He was deposed in 1728 by Abdalmalik of Morocco, yet he was restored briefly afterwards at Oued Beht. He was deposed once more, on the day of his death on 5 March 1729 at Meknes. He was succeeded by his half-brother Abdallah of Morocco.

Preceded by Ismail Ibn Sharif	Sultan of Morocco; 1727–1728	Succeeded by Abdalmalik of Morocco

Preceded by Abdalmalik of Morocco	Sultan of Morocco; 1728–1729	Succeeded by Abdallah of Morocco
