= Guich =

Military tribes in Moroccan history

- جيش/ڭيش (Arabic)
- Active: 1664–1912
- Country: Morocco
- Allegiance: Sultan of Morocco
- Branch: Army and Military police
- Type: Infantry and Cavalry
- Size: Unknown
- Garrison/HQ: Fes and Marrakesh
- Equipment: Moukahla; Nimcha; Khanjar; Winchester rifle (later)

Guich tribes, Gish tribes, or Jaysh tribes (Arabic: ڭيش, romanized: gīsh or Arabic: جيش, romanized: jaysh / jīsh, lit. 'Army'), or sometimes Makhzen tribes, were tribes of usually Arab origin organized by the sultans of Moroccan dynasties under the pre-colonial Makhzen regime to serve as troops and military garrisons, as well as to protect the outskirts of the capital and suppress rebellions. They were usually cantoned in their own lands and maintained a state of perpetual military mobilization. The contingents were formed in order to be loyal to the sultan only instead of to other local interests, but they often maintained a coherent group identity long after the death of the sultan and were sometimes the source of political instability. The historical guich system took shape primarily under the reign of the 'Alawid sultan Mawlay Isma'il, although variations of similar military organisations were used by prior rulers and dynasties. The major historical guich tribes were the Cheraga, the Udayas, the Cherarda, and the Bwakher. The guich constituted one of the main parts of the Moroccan army.

== History ==
=== Tribal governments before the 17th century ===
Prior to the reign of Mawlay Isma'il, most historical dynasties in Morocco generally rose to power via a particular tribe or coalition of tribes whose interests were aligned with the ruling elite. The Almoravids, Almohads, and Marinids, for example, each originated from, and were largely supported by, particular Amazigh (Berber) tribal confederations, such as the Lamtuna, Masmuda, and Zenata (respectively). These groups provided the mainstay of the dynasties' military forces, and were mostly paid through the sharing of loot after victories. However, given the limits of such recruitment, rulers with enough resources began to recruit military contingents made up of slaves and foreign mercenaries in order to remain militarily effective. For example, in the late 11th century the Almoravid emir Yusuf ibn Tashfin recruited a corps made up of Black or sub-Saharan slaves, and after this European Christians, either as slaves or mercenaries, were recruited and used for military operations in North Africa.

The later Wattasids (15th-16th centuries), who were also dependent on their Zenata kin, created a corps recruited mainly from Arab tribes who had immigrated to the western Maghreb in the preceding centuries, such as the Banu Ma'qil. They became known as the Cheraga or Sheraga, meaning "Easterners". The later Saadian dynasty in the 16th century, the first Arab Sharifian dynasty since the much earlier Idrisids, were the first dynasty to truly break with the tradition of tribal government, especially under the powerful sultan Ahmad al-Mansur (ruled 1578–1603). Some of the sultans recruited the Cheraga along with their own supporting tribes from the Sous (known as the Ahl Sus) and garrisoned them in important centers like Marrakesh and Fez. These groups were given their own lands and were exempt from taxation, but were expected to be ready to mobilize at any time in their lives. Because they had no existing local power base in Moroccan society, they were reliant on the sultan rather than the sultan being reliant on them. They were known as Qaba'il al-Jaysh ("army tribes"). Under Ahmad al-Mansur, Black slaves from the western Sudan were once again recruited as contingents, as were numerous Andalusis who had fled to North Africa after the fall of Granada at the end of the 15th century. Many of the regime's high officials and military officers were drawn from these groups (especially the Andalusis). Mawlay al-Rashid, the effective founder of the later 'Alawid Sultanate of Morocco, also combined his personal recruits from supportive Arab and Berber tribes with the existing remnants of the Cheraga as well, garrisoning them in forts like the Kasbah Cherarda in Fez.

=== The guich system of Mawlay Isma'il ===
However it was Mawlay Isma'il, the brother and successor of al-Rashid who ruled for 55 years between 1672 and 1727, who institutionalised the guich system to an unprecedented degree. He was motivated to do so by a desire to create a strong central government which was not hampered by reliance on any particular ethnic or regional group, conceiving his own authority as absolute and above all else. His elite guard and his most famous military corps, the 'Abid al-Bukhari, were made up of Black slaves from both the sub-Saharan region and from Morocco itself. He still recruited locals into the army, but he detached them from their personal tribal affiliations and integrated them into a regular army. This army consisted mostly of Arab warriors from the Banu Ma'qil and other southern tribes. The most important of these groups was commonly known as the Udayas (also spelled Wadaya, Oudaya, or Oudaia), after one of the Arab tribes that lived on the Haouz plains near Marrakesh and made up a significant part of their ranks. The other guich tribes were the Cheraga (composed of the Awlad Jama', Hawwara, Banu Amir, Banu Snus, Sej'a, Aḥlaf, Swid, and others), the Cherarda (composed of the Shabana, Zirara, Awlad Jerar, Ahl Sus, Awlad Mṭa', and others), and the Bwakher. Together, these groups dominated the military life of the country, and for much of the 18th century and early 19th century after Mawlay Isma'il's death they remained key political factions on whose support the 'Alawid sultans often had to rely. The 'Abid were initially based in Meknes and the Udayas were for many years garrisoned in Fez, but both groups were moved or expelled to different locations after certain episodes of political rivalry and conflict within the sultanate.

=== The guich system of the later 'Alawid sultans ===
For example, under the unstable reign of Mawlay Abdallah between 1729 and 1757 the city of Fez was in recurring conflict with the Udayas. They Udayas became one of Mawlay Abdallah's main pillars of support, but then became the main challenge to the power of his son and successor, Muhammad ibn Abdallah. In 1760 Muhammad was forced to march an army to Fez where he arrested their leaders and destroyed their contingents, killing many of their soldiers. In the aftermath the sultan created a new, much smaller, Udaya regiment which was given new commanders and garrisoned in Meknes instead. The Udayas were brought back to garrison Fez under Muhammad's more violent son and successor, Mawlay Yazid, during his brief reign in 1790–1792. After another episode of troubles in 1820, however, Sultan Abd al-Rahman expelled them from Fez permanently in 1824. Some of their remnants settled in the kasbah of Rabat, which consequently came to be known as the Kasbah of the Udayas or Udayas Kasbah.

Muhammad ibn Abdallah, for his part, was strong enough as sultan to control and break up the power of the other guich tribes as well. As he also did to the 'Abid al-Bukhari, he divided the Bwakher into smaller regiments and scattered them to different garrisons along the coastal cities. He also counteracted the power of the Sherarda in the region of Tadla and Marrakesh by recruiting fresh local tribes from the area into the guich system, such as the Mnabeha, Rḥamna, 'Abda, Aḥmar and Harbil. The guich tribes nonetheless remained important political players under the reigns of his successors, especially in times of weakness. The battle of Isly in 1844 during Abd al-Rahman's reign, and the Tetuan war in 1859 during Muhammad IV's reign revealed to the Makhzen the weakness of the outdated Moroccan army based on guich contingents, even against very weak European powers such as Spain. It was only under Muhammad IV (ruled 1859–1873) that a new army (the 'askar) was organized along a European model, trained by French officers. This definitively reduced the influence of the guich. Hassan I was successful at disassembling the guich, although not as successful in replacing it with a reformed army. Abd al-Hafid attempted to impose regular taxes on the guich tribes, especially the ones around Fes, despite them traditionally being exempt from taxation in exchange for military service. This led to the Cherada protesting against these changes. The four guich tribes remained in existence even under the French protectorate in the 20th century.

== Organization and training ==
As with the Saadian army regiments, the 'Alawid guich tribes were given lands on which to settle, usually between 5 and 18 hectares per warrior, and were exempt from taxation, but expected to remain in military service. Military positions were often passed down from father to son, thus forming a kind of hereditary caste. Each guich tribe was led by a pasha or a qa'id (also transliterated as kaid or caïd), a commander, who was often by default the governor of certain cities or areas where the tribe was garrisoned. Each tribe was divided into regiments of 500 men known as a rḥa, which were led by a qa'id rḥa, similar to a colonel. Each regiment was in turn divided into groups of 100 men and further subdivided into groups of 20, each with their own officers. Private soldiers were known as mkhzani ("those of the makhzen"). The administration of the tribe's affairs was typically entrusted to a sheikh who was the oldest qa'id rḥa.

In the 'Alawid period the guich troops were distinguished, among other things, as horsemen, and were known for practicing equestrian games. In the later period they were armed with Winchester rifles, but also carried the sekkin (a sword), and two types of carved daggers known as the kummiya and the khanjar.
