= Oudaya =

Arab tribe in Morocco

Oudaya الاوداية الودايا
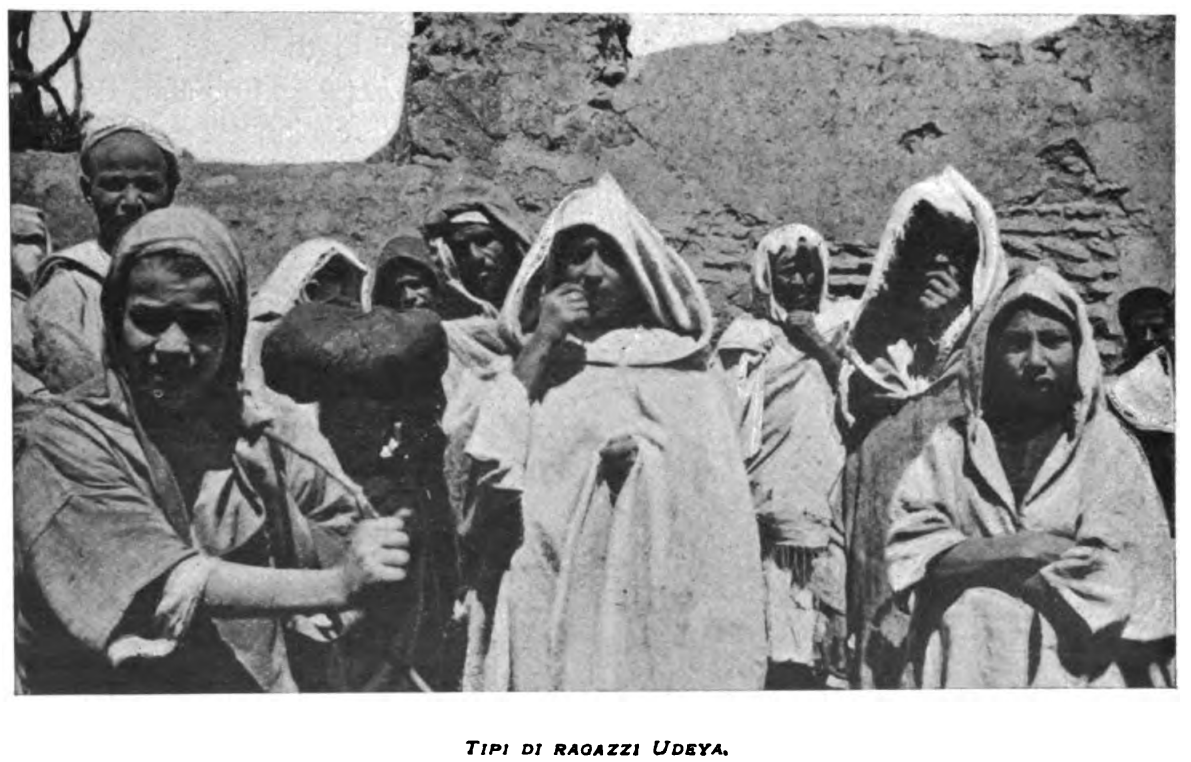
- Boys from the Oudaya c. 1907
- Ethnicity: Arab
- Nisba: al-Oudiyi
- Location: Around Fez and Marrakesh, in Rabat
- Descended from: Oudei
- Parent tribe: Maqil
- Language: Arabic
- Religion: Sunni Islam

The Oudaya (Arabic: الاوداية, romanized: Ūdāya) also written as Udaya, Oudaia and sometimes referred to as Wadaya (Arabic: الودايا, romanized: Wadāyā) is an Arab tribe in Morocco of Maqil origin. They are situated around Fez and Meknes, Marrakesh and in Rabat. They were recruited by Ismail Ibn Sharif as one of the guich tribes that formed an integral component of the pre-colonial Moroccan military. The Mghafra (Arabic: المغافرة, romanized: Maghāfira) or the Banu Maghfar, a sub-tribe of the Oudaya, founded several emirates in Mauritania, for example the Emirate of Trarza, as a result of the Char Bouba War.

== Etymology ==
The name Oudaya is the plural of the Arabic word oued (Arabic: واد, romanized: wād) which means river as well as the words awdāʾ (اوداء), awdiya (أودية) and awdāh (أوداه; in the dialect of Tayy). This was corrupted into awādiya (أوادية). Ibn Sidah said the correct form is awdāya (الاوداية) and said:

أما تريني رجلا دعكاية
اقطع الابحر والاوداية

== History ==
=== Origins ===
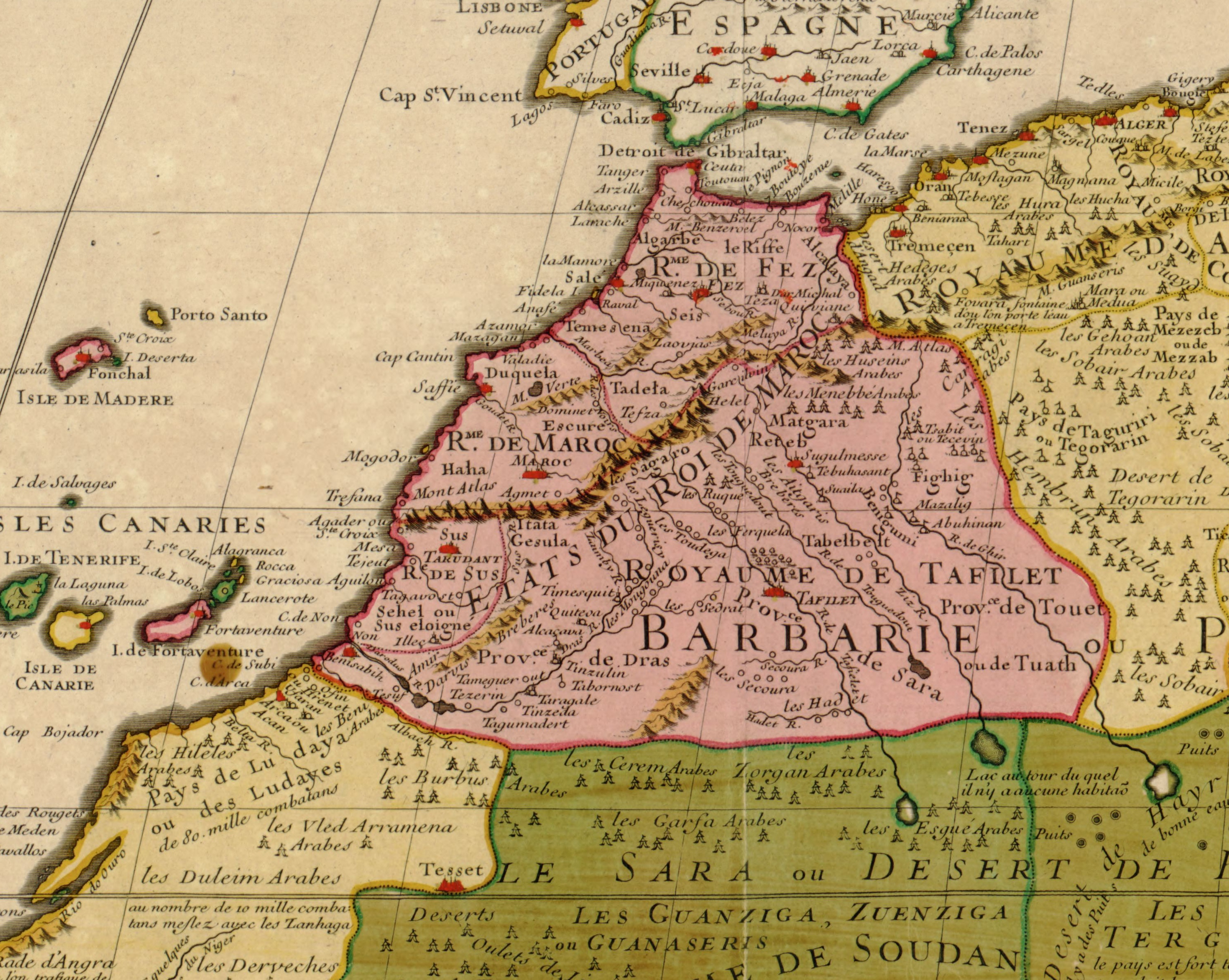
1707 Map of Morocco by Guillaume Delisle showing the historical position of the Oudaya (Ludaya or Ludayes) in the Sahara

According to historical authors Leo Africanus and Marmol Carvajal, the Oudaya came from the Banu Hassan branch of the Ma'qil. Leo Africanus estimates the Oudaya to number more than 60,000 and situates them between Ouadane and Oualata.

According to the 19th century historian an-Nasiri, Moulay Ismail encountered the Oudaya through a poor shepherd Bou-Chefra. He learned that his people were fleeing famine, and decided to recruit them. He told Bou-Chefra:

You are my maternal aunts and you have heard of me and you have not come to me. Now, you are my companion. Go take your sheep back to your tent and come back to see me in Marrakesh!

=== Formation of the Oudaya Guich ===
The guich tribes were tribes typically of Arab origin that served as a part of the pre-colonial Moroccan military under the 'Alawi dynasty. The Oudaya were one of the major guich tribes that served under the 'Alawis. They rose to prominence under Moulay Ismail who aimed to reorganize the army by institutionalizing the guich system and create a new strong central government as a result of a set of military setbacks he suffered like the disastrous campaign against the Ottoman Regency of Algeria. This culminated in the creation of the 'Abid al-Bukhari, an elite guard made up of black slaves from Morocco and Sub-Saharan Africa as well as the creation of the Oudaya Guich. In 1678, he married Khanatha bint Bakkar who was the daughter of Shaykh Bakkar, an important leader and tribal shaykh of the Oudaya. This marriage confirmed an alliance between the Makhzen and the Oudaya and by the terms of this alliance the Oudaya provided the sultan with a large and powerful guich. He stations these troops from the Oudaya outside the walls of the city of Fez.

Ismail called the Oudaya the tribe of his maternal uncles in order to form a fictive or real kinship between him and the tribe as his mother Mubarka bint Yark al-Maghfiri was born either as a member or a black slave of the Mghafra (a division of the Oudaya).

=== Revolt of the Oudaya (1831–1834) ===
As a result of Moulay Abd al-Rahman's withdrawal from Tlemcen in March 1831, the Oudaya rebelled in the countryside of Morocco. The revolt began in the north and spread throughout Morocco, including the capital Fez, the sultan decided to leave Fez for Meknes which was safer and was protected by the 'Abid al-Bukhari infantry, but on the way to Meknes he was stopped by rebel troops who sent him back to Fez. The Oudaya directed their grievances to the chief minister Muhammad bin Idris and tried to avoid directly assaulting or critiquing the Sultan because of his Prophetic lineage. In response, Moulay Abd al-Rahman dismissed this minister, took away his wealth, and gave it to the Oudaya as a generous bribe, but the Oudaya still kept him hostage. A few months later, the sultan managed to escape Fes and settle in Meknes, where he slowly built the army there by recruiting more troops. With this army, he marched on Fes and besieged it for 40 days before the Oudaya surrendered in 1834. The sultan ordered the execution of the two most important leaders of the Oudaya revolt, and dispersed them from Fes to Marrakesh, Larache, and Rabat, ending their rebellion. They were reinstated after 1844.

== Subdivisions and families ==
According to Alfred Le Chatelier, the Oudaya around Fez are made up of two large fractions: Oulad Bou-Ris and Oulad Zaim. These factions are made up of smaller sub-fractions or villages like El-Karia, Temra and Oulad Djedjem.

In Rabat, the Jirari family (Arabic: الجراري) is of Oudaya origin specifically descending from the Oudaya who were exiled to Rabat. There's also a Loudiyi family (Arabic: الأوديي) in Rabat.

== Notable members ==
Some members of the tribe include:

- Lalla Khanatha bint Bakkar, daughter of a tribal shaykh and leader of the Oudaya, Bakkar al-Mghafri. Bakkar offered her to Ismail ibn Sharif who admired and married her because of her education in many sciences and beauty. She was the mother of Abdallah of Morocco.
- Qaid Idris al-Jarari (Arabic: القائد إدريس الجراري), governor of Oujda during the time of Abd al-Rahman of Morocco and his uncle. He settled in the Kasbah of the Oudayas to oversee the members of the Guich Oudaya that settled in the area of Rabat.

== Kasbah of the Oudayas ==
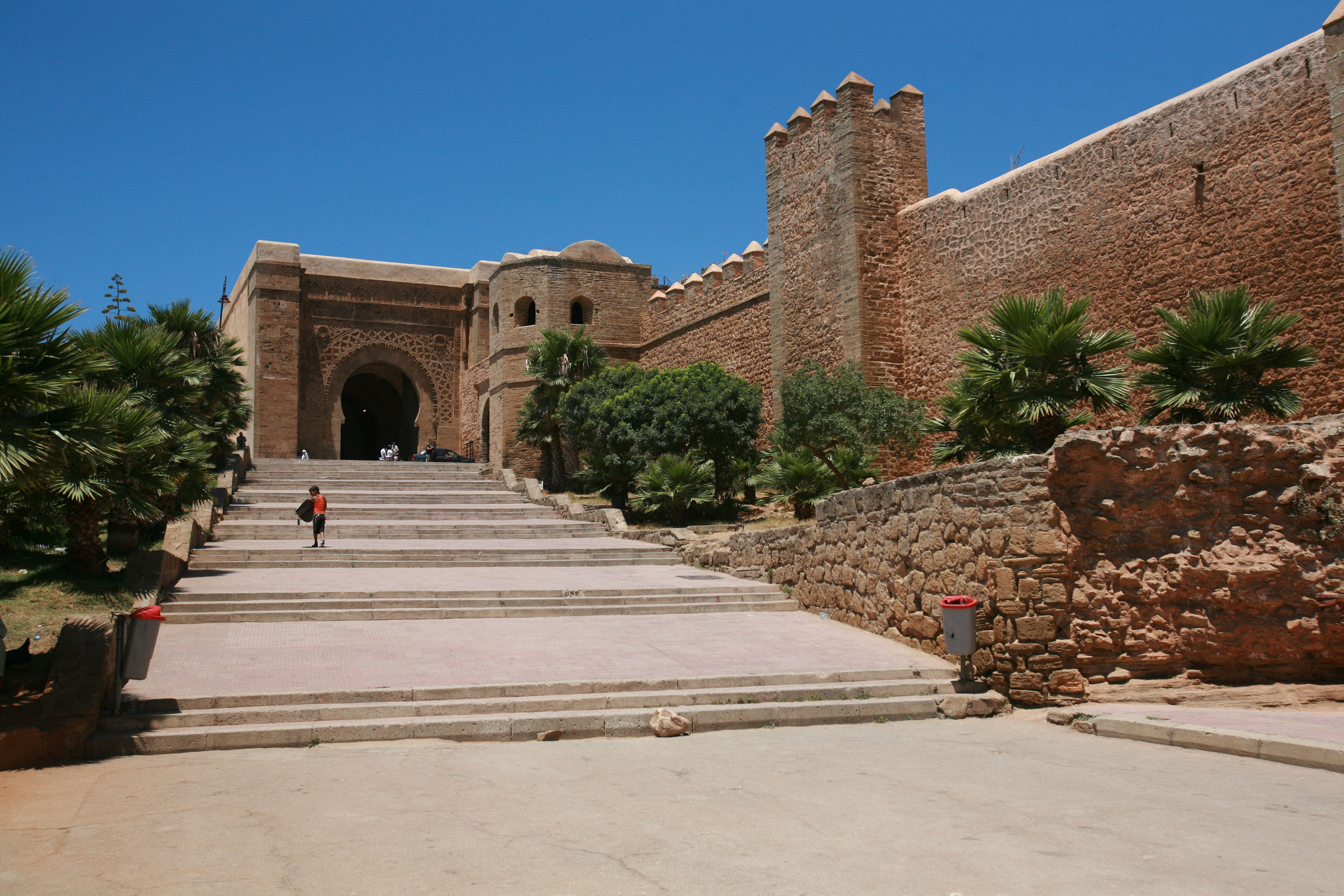
Walls of the Kasbah and the Bab Oudaya

The Kasbah of the Oudayas is a kasbah in Rabat situated on a hill at the mouth of the Bou Regreg. Although it was built in the 12th century, the name "Oudaya" was not associated with it until the 19th century when the tribe was expelled from Fez in response to their revolt. Part of them settled in the kasbah which was uninhabited at the time.

== Sources ==
- Bennison, Amira K (2 September 2003). Jihad and its interpretations in pre-colonial Morocco: state-society relations during the French conquest of Algeria. United Kingdom: Taylor & Francis. ISBN 9781135788148.
- El Hamel, Chouki (2014). Black Morocco A History of Slavery, Race, and Islam. United States: Cambridge University Press (published 27 February 2014). ISBN 9781139620048.
- Miller, Susan Gibson (2013). A History of Modern Morocco. United States: Cambridge University Press (published 8 April 2013). ISBN 9781139619110.
