= Kasbah of the Udayas =

Historical neighborhood in Rabat, Morocco

- قصبة الأوداية (Arabic)
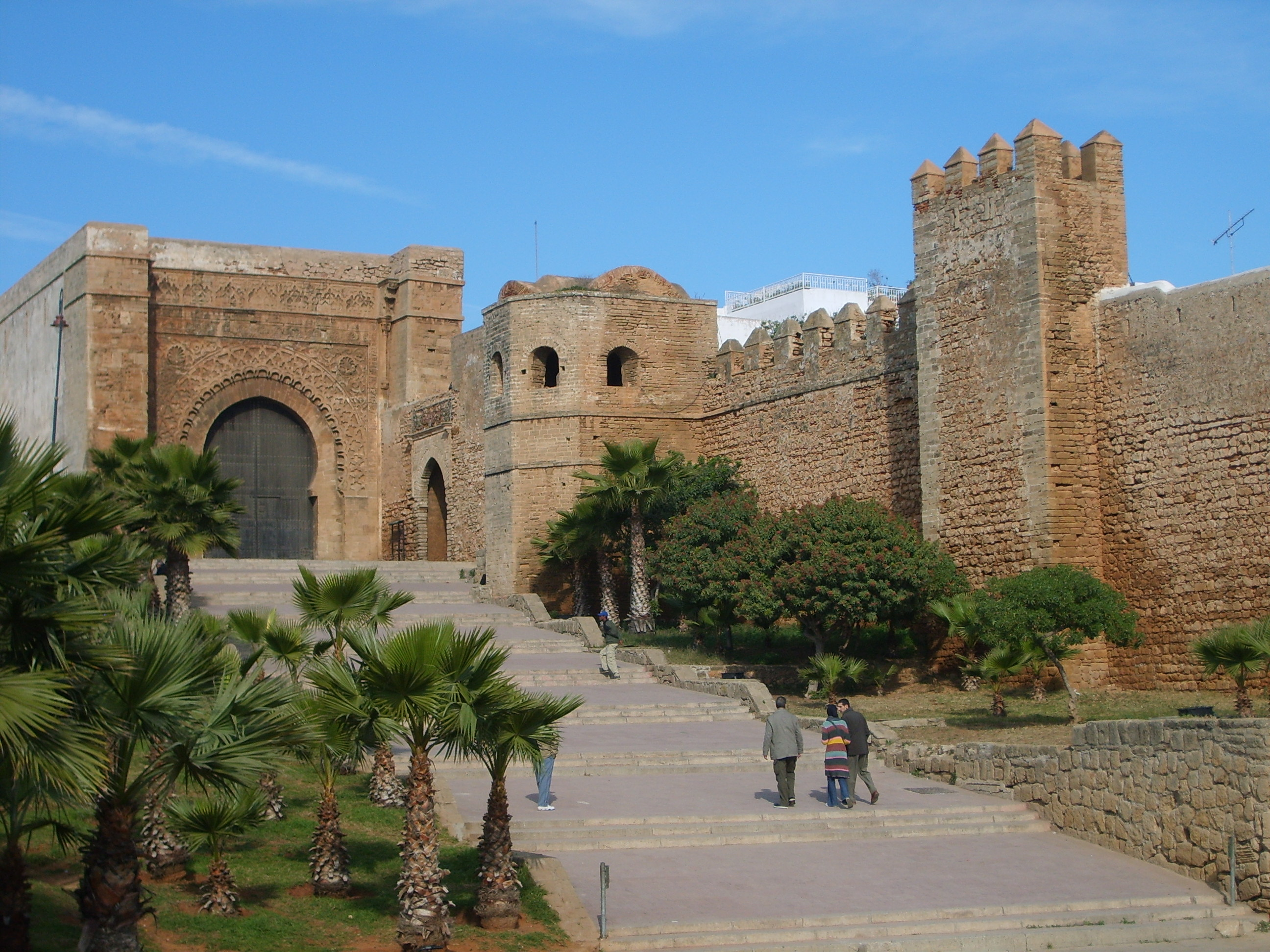
- The walls of the kasbah and the main Almohad gate, Bab Oudaia.
- Interactive map of Kasbah of the Udayas
- 34°01′50″N 06°50′08″W
- Type: Kasbah
- Location: Rabat, Morocco

History
- Built: 12th century

Site notes
- Architectural style: Moroccan

The Kasbah of the Udayas (Arabic: قصبة الأوداية, romanized: Qaṣbat al-Awdāya), also spelled Kasbah of the Oudaias or of the Oudayas, is a kasbah (citadel) in Rabat, Morocco. It is located on a hill at the mouth of the Bou Regreg opposite Salé, and adjacent to the Medina quarter of Rabat. It is listed, along with other sites in Rabat, as a UNESCO World Heritage Site.

== Name ==
The kasbah takes its name from the Udaya tribe. This name only became associated with the kasbah in the 19th century after the tribe was permanently expelled from Fez. A fraction of the tribe settled in the then previously almost uninhabited kasbah. The use of al-Widaya (الوداية) instead of al-Awdāya has become popular in Morocco.

== History ==
In the 10th century the Umayyads of Cordoba, or their Zenata Berber allies in the region, founded a ribat or fortified monastery/outpost in this area, to defend against the Barghawata Berbers, who had established a Kharijite state to the south. This ribat was most likely on the same site as the current Kasbah of the Udayas, but its location has not been confirmed by historians. One of the last Almoravid emirs, Tashfin ibn Ali (ruled 1143-45) built a new ribat on the site of the current kasbah during his efforts to repel the Almohad Caliphate, but the Almohads defeated the Almoravids and destroyed the ribat.

In 1150 or 1151 the Almohad caliph Abd al-Mu'min built a new kasbah (citadel) over the site of the former ribat, within which he included a palace and a mosque. He also had an underground canal dug to divert a water source to the area, allowing for future settlement and urbanization. The later caliph Yaqub al-Mansur (ruled 1184–1199) embarked on a huge project to construct a new fortified imperial capital, called al-Mahdiyya or Ribat al-Fath, on the site of what is now the medina (old city) of Rabat, with new walls extending over a vast area beyond the old kasbah. This project also included the construction of an enormous mosque (the remains of which include the Hassan Tower) and of new grand gateways including Bab er-Rouah, a major gate in the city's western wall, and what is now called Bab Udaya or Bab al-Kbir, the gate of the Kasbah. After Abu Yusuf Ya'qub's death in 1199 the mosque and the capital remained unfinished and his successors lacked the resources or the will to finish it. The kasbah itself became essentially abandoned. Meanwhile, the town of Salé across the river, grew in importance and was developed during the Marinid era.

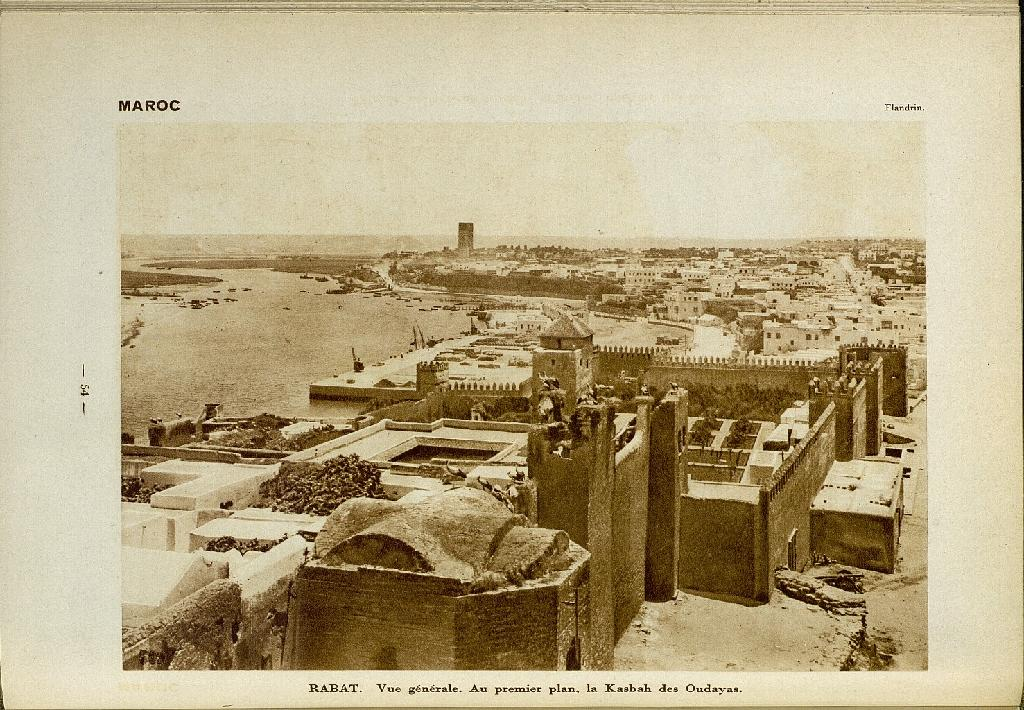
View over the kasbah circa 1931 (looking southeast towards the city)

In 1609, Philip III decreed the expulsion of all Moriscos (people of Muslim or Moorish descent) from Spain. About 2000 of these refugees, originally from the town of Hornachos near Badajoz, Spain, settled around Salé and occupied the kasbah, attracting between 5000 and 14,000 other Moriscos to join them. They established their own autonomous republic, referred as the Republic of Salé (or Republic of Bou Regreg), which served as a base for corsairs: pirates, also known as the "Salé Rovers", who preyed on merchant ships around the shores of Western Europe and generally sold the crews into slavery.

During this time (early 17th century) they built a broad platform on the kasbah's northeastern edge, overlooking the river, which was used for semaphore signalling. A warehouse structure was later added on it during the 18th century, used today as a school and a carpet workshop. Below the platform, to the North, was a sqala, a seaside fortification and artillery platform, while just 25 meters upriver from this, to the East, was the "Tower of the Corsairs", also added in the 18th century. This was a round tower with openings for 4 canons aimed at the river. The tower rose only 3 meters above the water and was hidden from view behind the sqala, thus allowing its canons to catch pursuing enemy ships by surprise. The Republic of Salé remained outside the control of the central government until 1666, when the 'Alawi sultan Moulay Rashid took over the area and placed the corsairs under his authority.

The southwestern section of the Kasbah today was added during the Alaouite period, especially in the 18th century. It includes a palace or royal pavilion built by Sultan Moulay Ismail (ruled 1672–1727) at the end of the 17th century and serving today as a museum. Moulay Ismail was also responsible for settling a part of the Udayas (or Oudayas), a guich tribe ("Army" tribe serving in the sultan's military), in the kasbah to serve as a counterbalancing force against other unruly tribes in the region. However, the name "Udaya" only became associated with the kasbah in the 19th century, after the tribe was permanently expelled from the region of Fez by the Alaouite sultan Abd ar-Rahman and their remaining members settling in the kasbah.

A restoration of the Kasbah of the Udayas was initiated in 1914 under the French Protectorate. The work was led by Maurice Tranchant with the assistance of local master craftsmen, including Hadj Driss Tourouguy. The Kasbah, along with other historic sites in Rabat, was added to the UNESCO World Heritage Tentative List on July 20, 2006, in the cultural category. It was granted World Heritage Status in 2012.

== Major structures and monuments ==
The upper or northern part of the kasbah, above the museum, dates mostly from its foundation/reconstruction in the Almohad period under Caliph Ya'qub al-Mansur in the 12th century, while the lower parts date from the 18th century during the Alaouite period. The northern part of the kasbah is centered around the Street of the Mosque (Rue Jamaa), which runs between the Bab Oudaia gate and the semaphore platform, passing by the kasbah's Old Mosque. The southern part is taken up to a large extent by the Andalusian Gardens, the Oudayas Museum, and a nearby café and terrace known as Café Maure.

=== Great Gate of the Kasbah (Bab Oudaya) ===
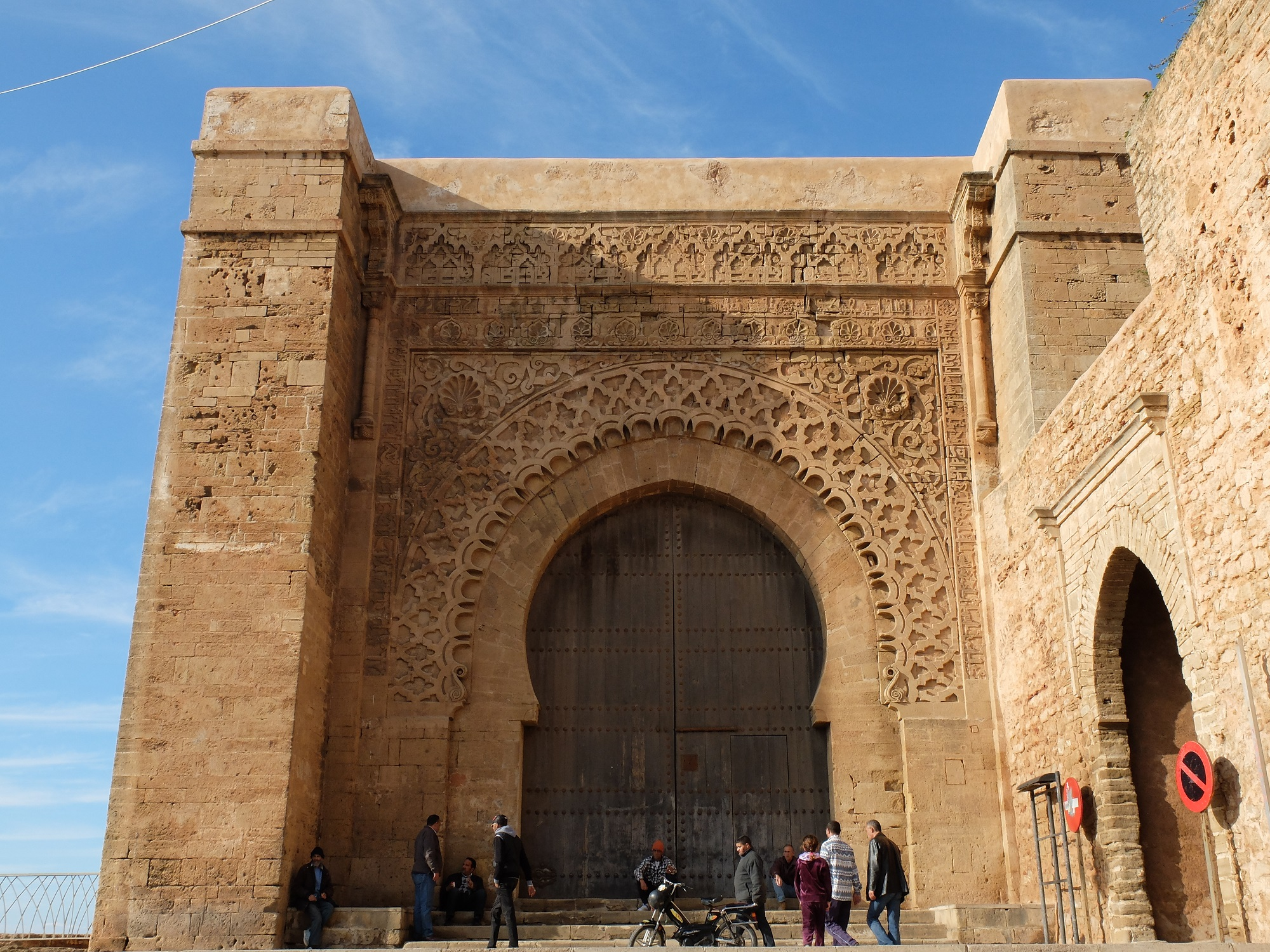
The façade of Bab Oudaya or Bab Lakbir, the monumental Almohad gate of the Kasbah

The monumental gate of the kasbah, located uphill and overlooking Rabat below, is considered one of the most beautiful gates of Almohad and Moroccan architecture. It goes by the name Bab Oudaia ("Udaya Gate") or Bab al-Kbir ("Great Gate"). It was built by the Almohad caliph Ya'qub al-Mansur between 1195 and 1199, inserted into the previous walls of the kasbah built by Abd al-Mu'min around 1150. It has both an outer facade (facing southeast towards the city) and an inner facade (facing northeast onto the Street of the Mosque), both richly decorated. The massive gate was largely ceremonial and had little defensive value, given its position already inside the city walls; unlike Bab er-Rouah, the ornate western gate in Rabat's city walls, built around the same time, it was not flanked by true defensive towers.

The carved decoration around the horseshoe arch entrance features a curved band of interlacing geometric forms (specifically, a pattern known as darj wa ktaf, commonly seen in Moroccan architecture), set inside a rectangular frame outlined by a Qur'anic inscription frieze in Kufic Arabic script. In the corners between this curved band and the inscription are carved arabesque or floral patterns with a palmette or scallop shell at their middle, and above these is another carved frieze of palmettes. At both corners of the horseshoe arch (at the bottom of the curved band of geometric carvings) are serpentine "S"-like forms, probably representing eels, which are a very rare motif in Almohad or Moroccan architecture. The external facade of the inner gate, facing towards the kasbah, has carved decoration very similar to that of the outer gate, but with minor differences in the choice of geometric forms. Inside, the gate has three chambers which form a bent passage.

=== The Old Mosque (Mosque of the Kasbah) ===
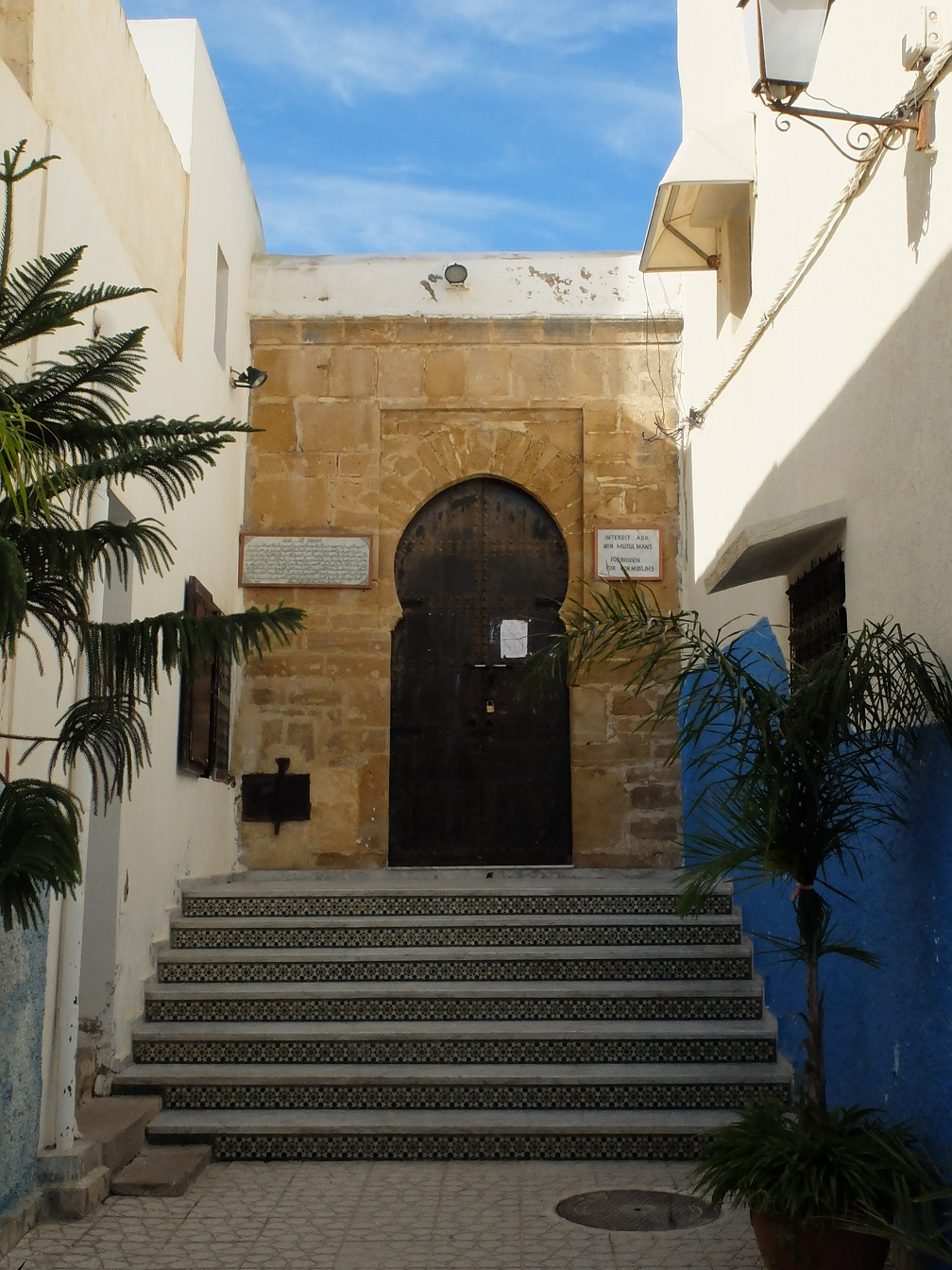
Doorway of the Old Mosque (just off the main street)

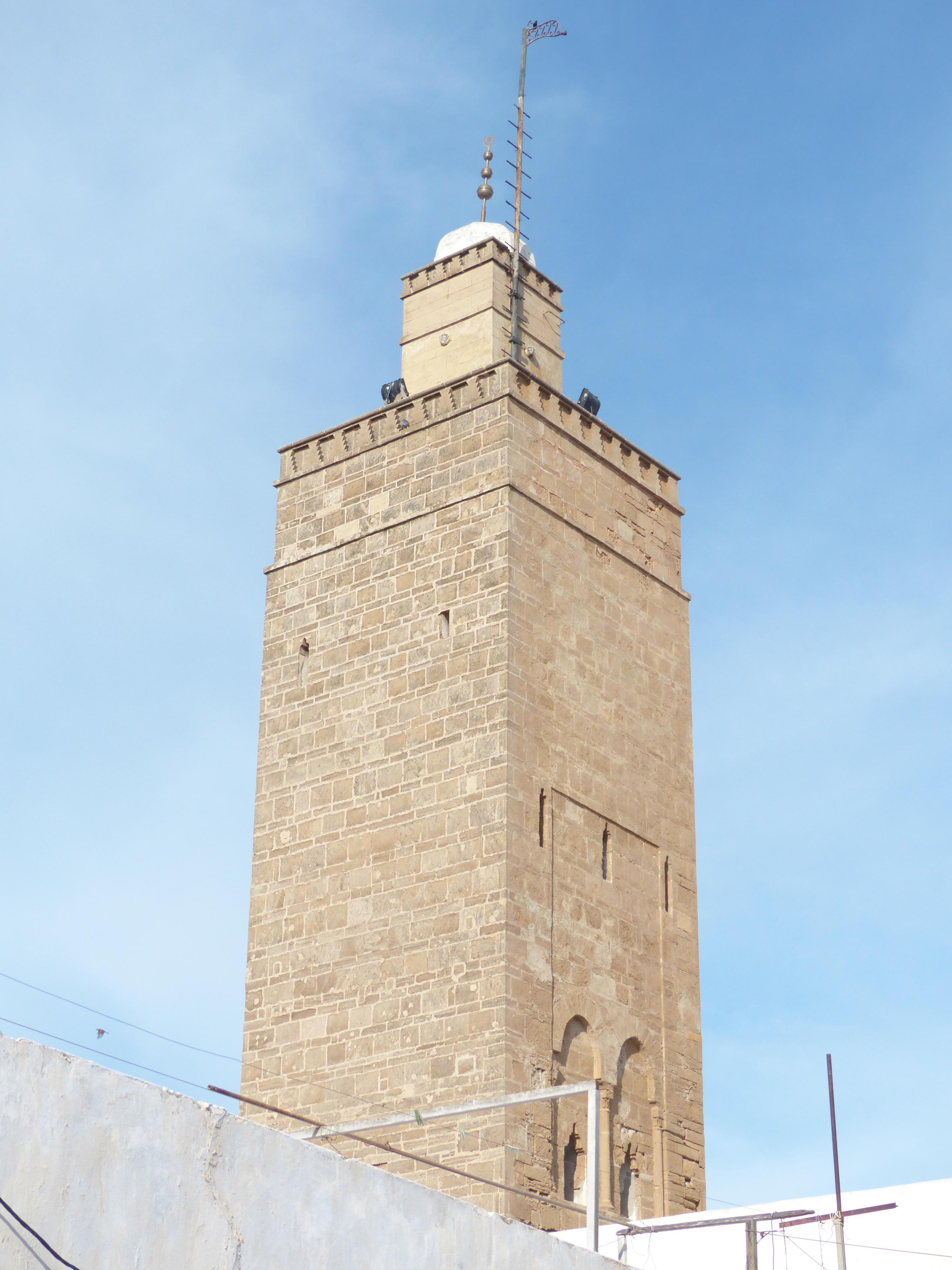
Minaret of the Old Mosque

The oldest current structure at the site of the Kasbah is its main mosque, the Jama' al-'Atiqa ("Old Mosque"). Dating from Abd al-Mu'min's construction in 1150, it was largely restored in the 18th century, during the reign of Sultan Mohammed ben Abdallah, by an English corsair known as Ahmed el-Inglizi. The minaret dates from this later restoration.

The mosque measures about 26.5 by 25 metres but its outline is partly irregular due to modifications over the centuries. Its exterior is mainly made of stone while the arches of the interior are made in brick. Like many medieval western Islamic mosques, its qibla (direction of prayer) is not aligned with the true direction of Mecca but faces mostly south, following an older tradition based on a hadith. The mosque can be entered via four horseshoe arch doorways. Inside is a rectangular courtyard (sahn) surrounded by galleries on three sides and by the prayer hall to the south/southeast. The layout of the prayer hall follows the typical "T"-plan of medieval Moroccan mosques: it is split by rows of arches into seven "naves" running perpendicular to the qibla wall, of which the central one is wider than the others and is aligned with the mihrab (niche symbolizing the direction of prayer). The walls and arches of the mosque's interior are painted white, with the lower walls decorated with Moroccan tilework while the upper walls and the spandrels of the arches are decorated with carved stucco. The mihrab is the most richly decorated feature, again featuring ornate patterns in carved stucco. This decoration, however, is of recent date.

One unusual feature of the mosque's layout is the fact that the minaret stood separate from the rest of the mosque and behind the qibla (southeastern) wall, and was only connected to the mosque in 1940. The minaret is made of stone and has a square shaft measuring about 4.55 meters to one side. It is modestly decorated with blind arches on its facades.

=== Pavilion of Moulay Ismail (National Jewellery Museum) ===
The southern part of the kasbah includes a former pavilion or palace residence built by Sultan Moulay Ismail (ruled 1672–1727) at the end of the 17th century. The building is centered around a main courtyard and is distinguished on the outside by a tower. For a while, the palace also served as a madrasa. In 1915, during the French Protectorate over Morocco, the building was converted into a museum on the initiative of Prosper Ricard, director of the Service des Arts Indigènes under Lyautey. It became an ethnographic museum with a collection initially made up of donations from Prosper Ricard himself, Alfred Bel, and Jean Besancenot. The museum's collection expanded to include jewellery, musical instruments, ceramics, Qur'ans and manuscripts (some as old as the 12th century), costumes, silks, and carpets, from different parts of the country. In 2006, following a restoration, it became the National Jewellery Museum, devoted to the history of Moroccan jewellery, along with some other objects. In 2014, the museum was closed for long-term refurbishments by the National Foundation of Museums. It reopened in January 2023.

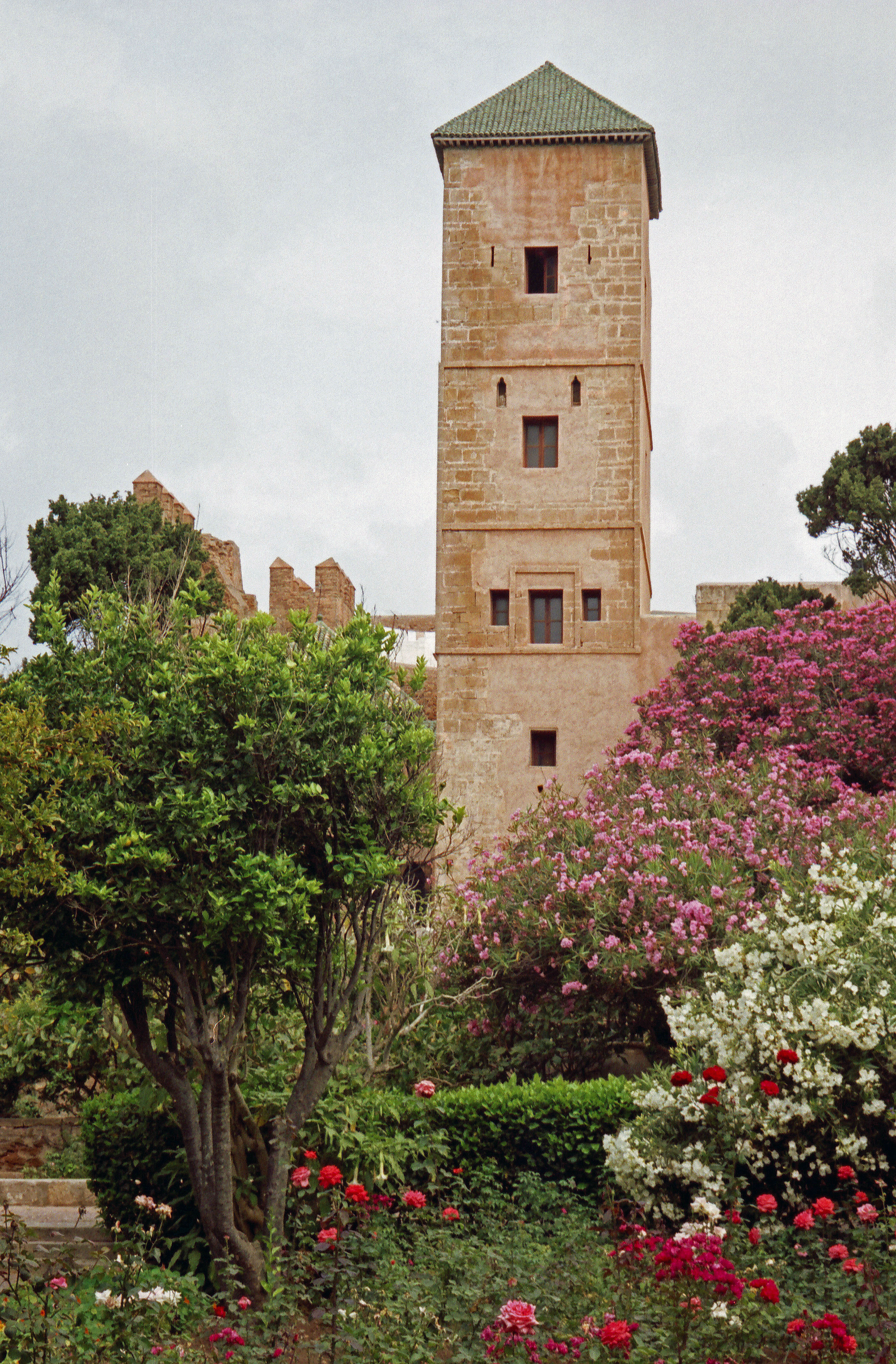
The tower of the pavilion of Moulay Ismail (Oudayas Museum)

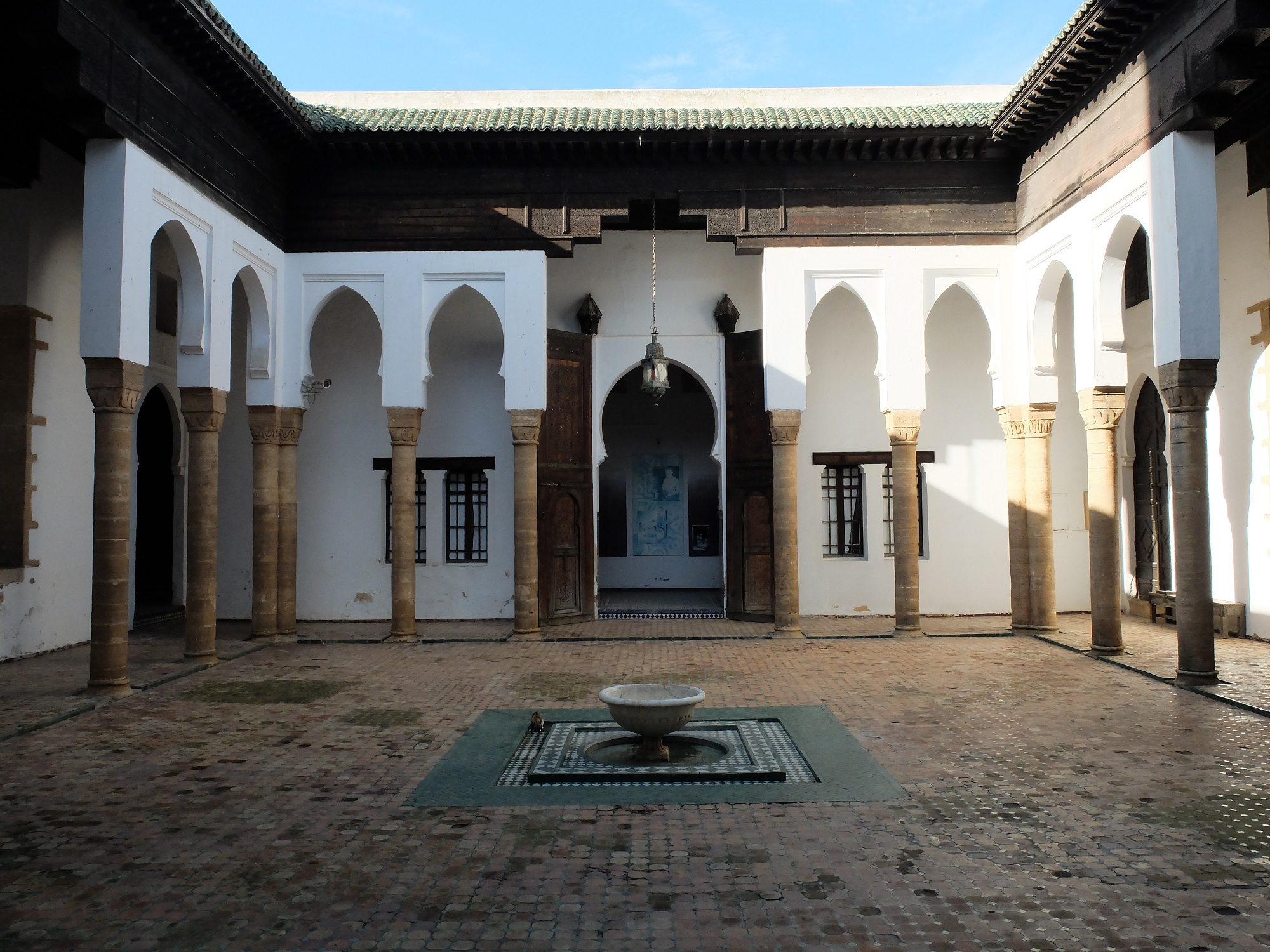
The main courtyard of the residential pavilion of Moulay Ismail, now part of the Oudayas Museum

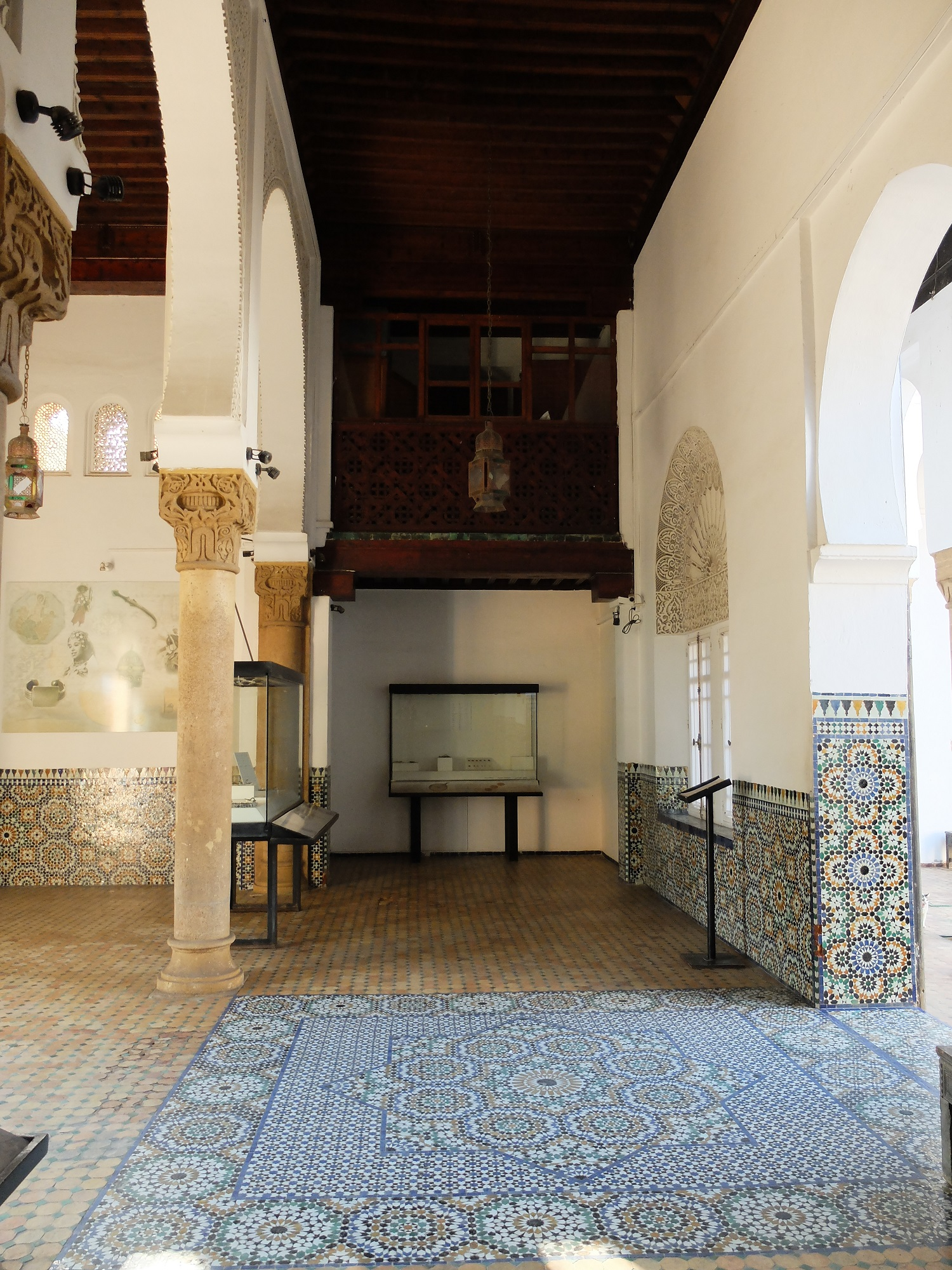
One of the rooms or vestibules, with decoration including zellij tilework

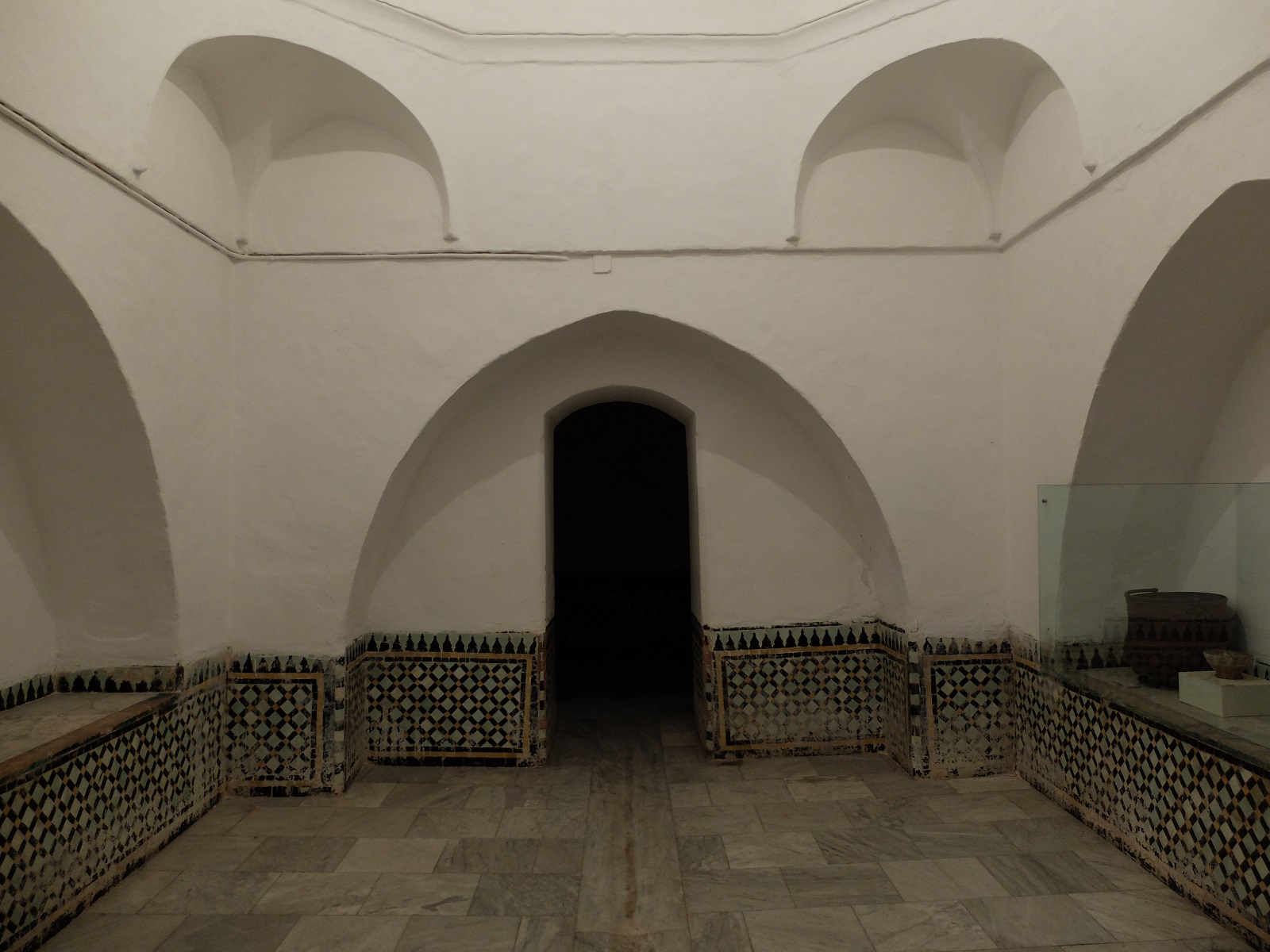
A room in the former hammam (bathhouse) of the residential pavilion

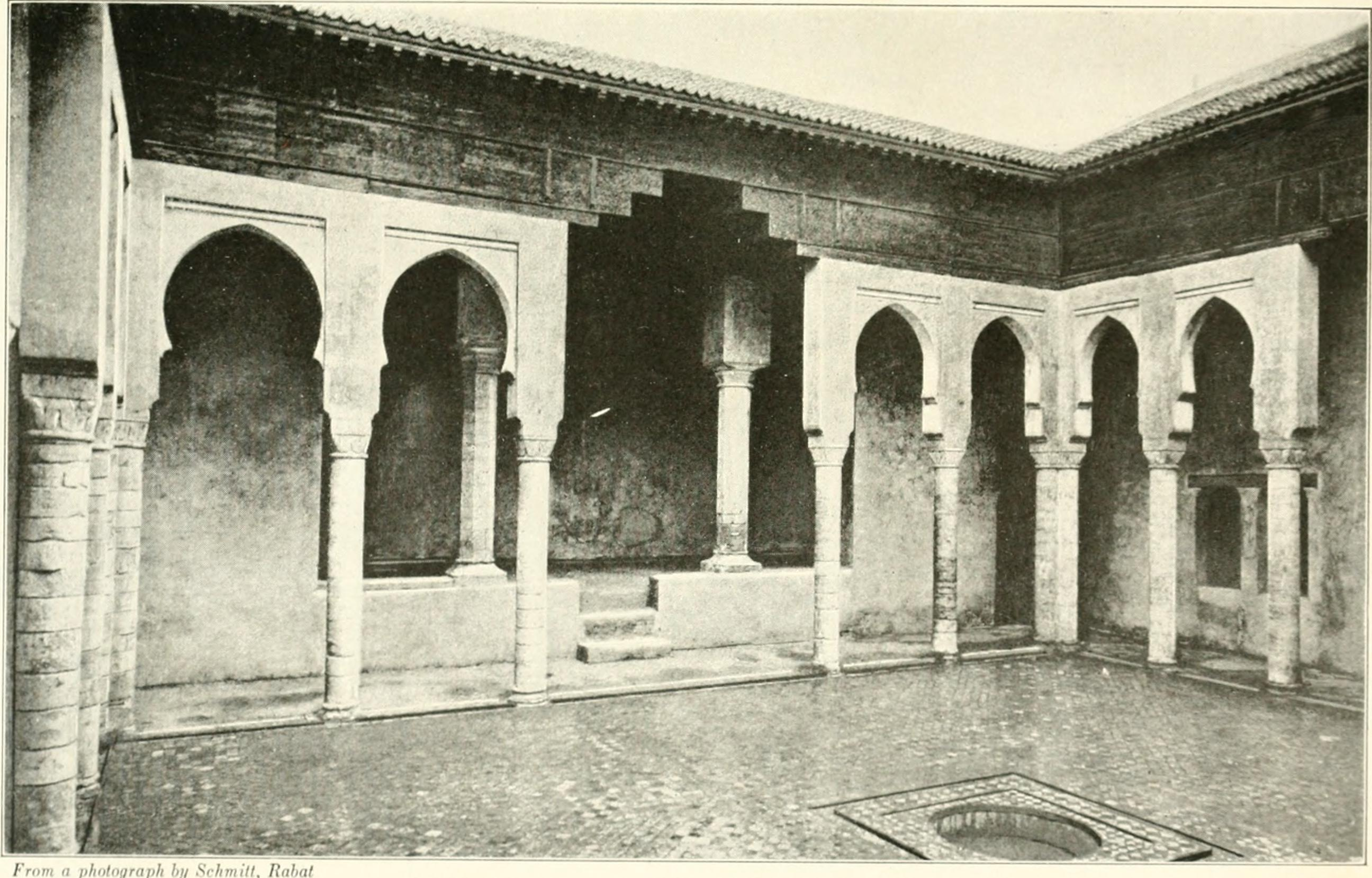
1920 picture of the pavilion

=== Andalusian Garden ===
The "Andalusian Garden" next to the museum was created between 1915 and 1918, during the French protectorate in Morocco, under Maurice Tranchant De Lunel. It was created on the site of what was formerly the mechouar (public square or parade ground) of the palace pavilion. It is a formal garden inspired by the Moorish gardens of al-Andalus (Andalucia) and features a variety of trees and plants such as bougainvillea and citrus trees. It is frequented by tourists and locals.

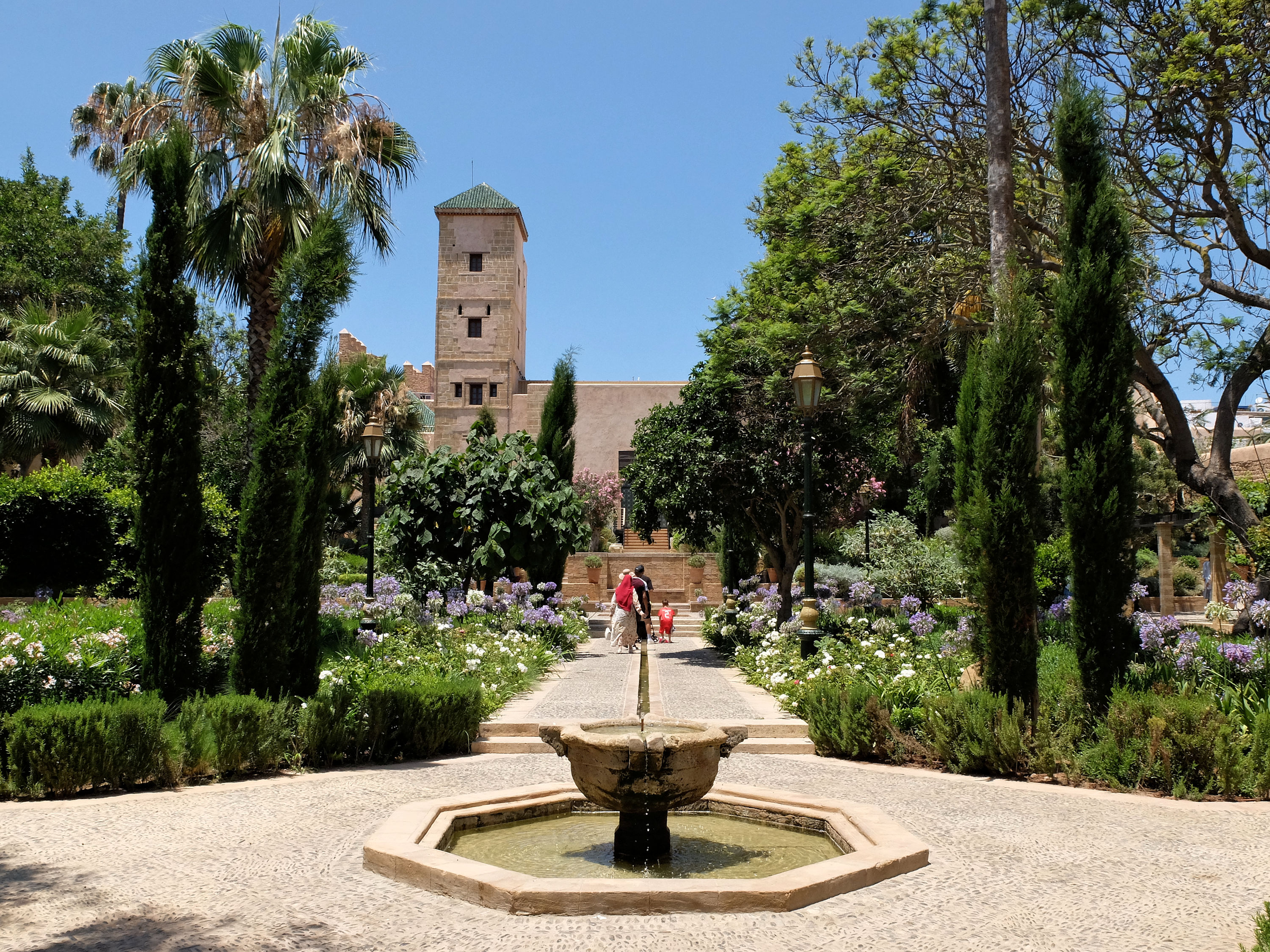
The Andalusian Gardens of the kasbah, looking towards the pavilion of Moulay Ismail

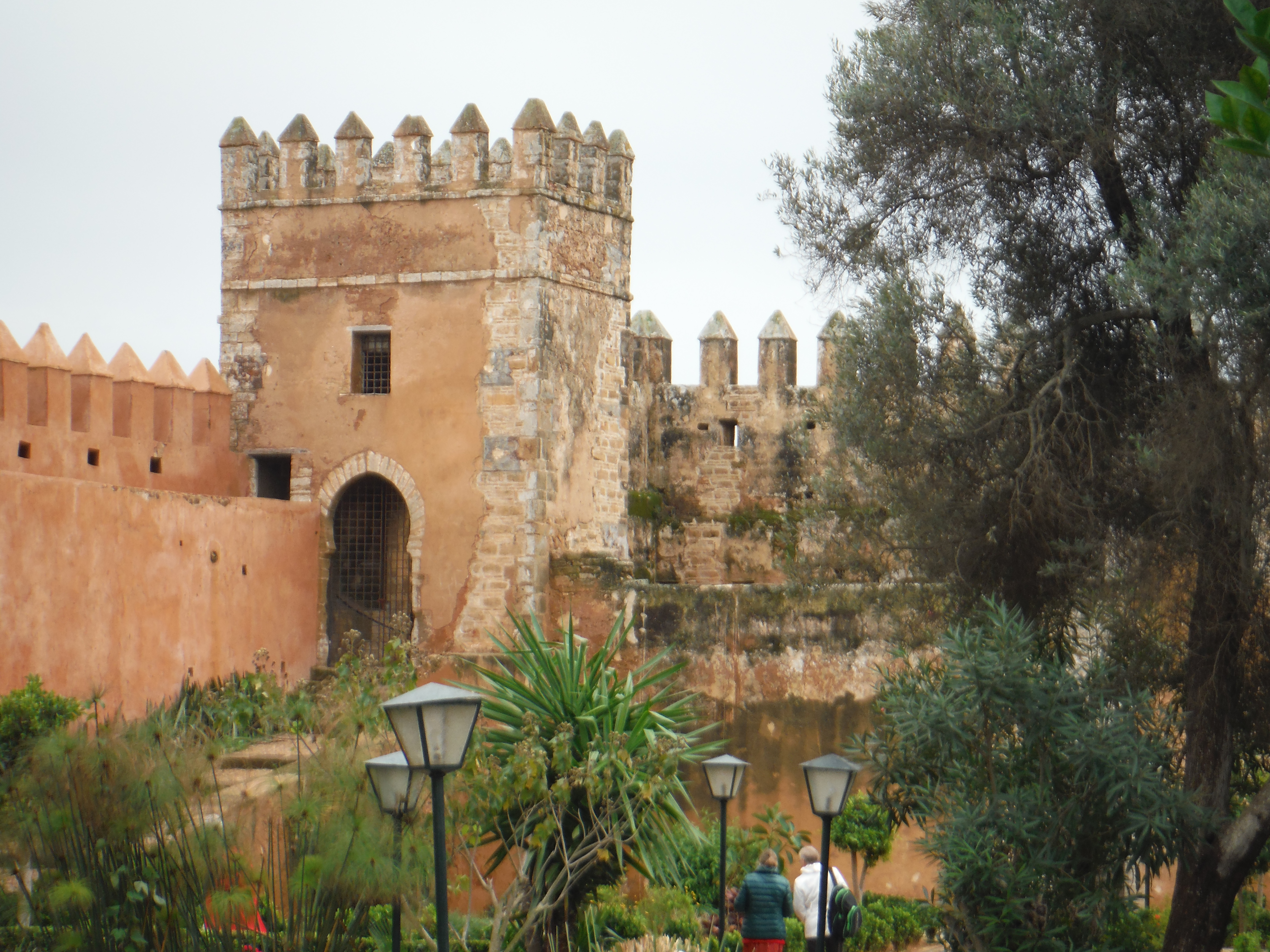
The walls and one of the towers surrounding the gardens

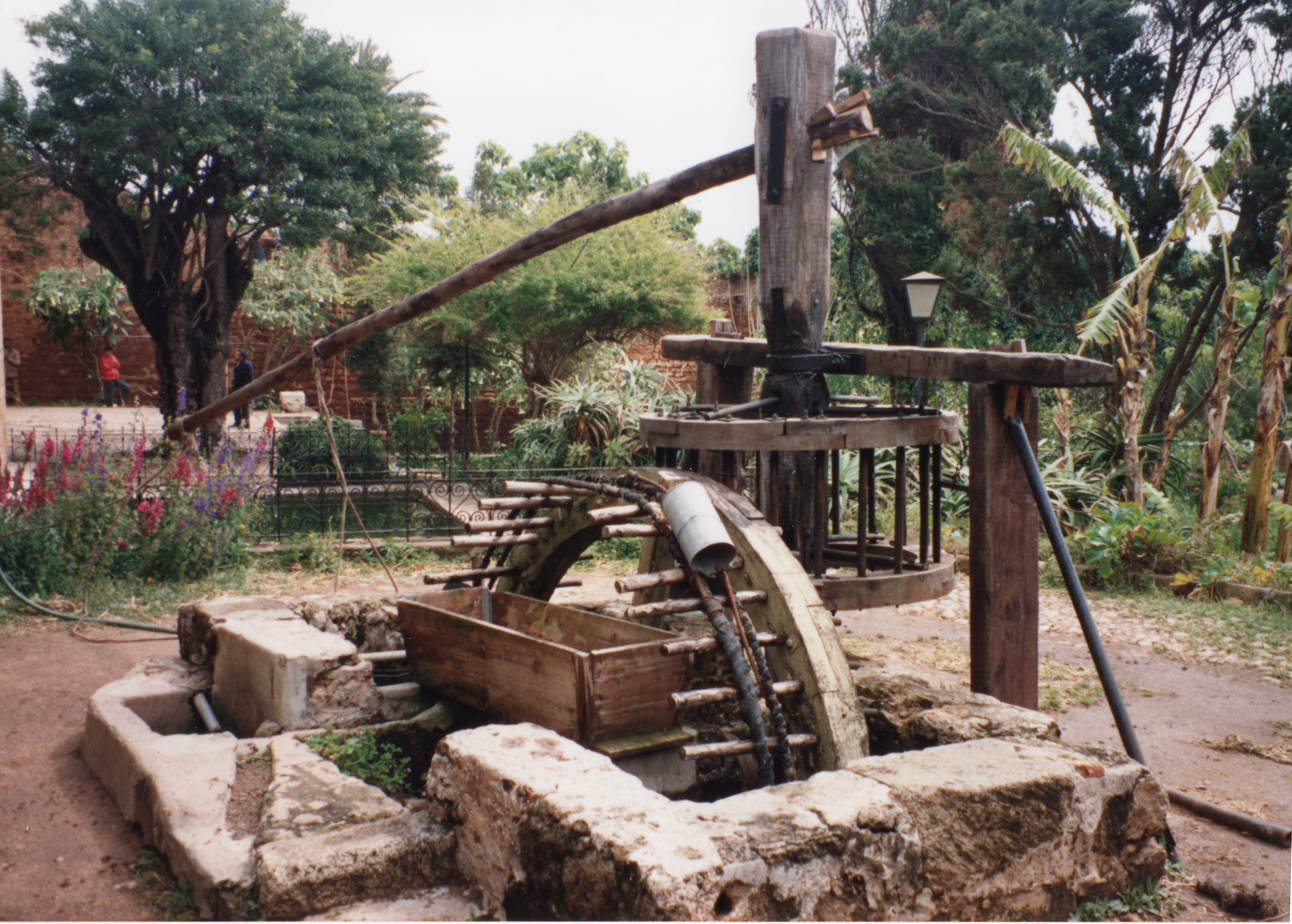
1989 picture of a waterwheel at the Andalusian Gardens

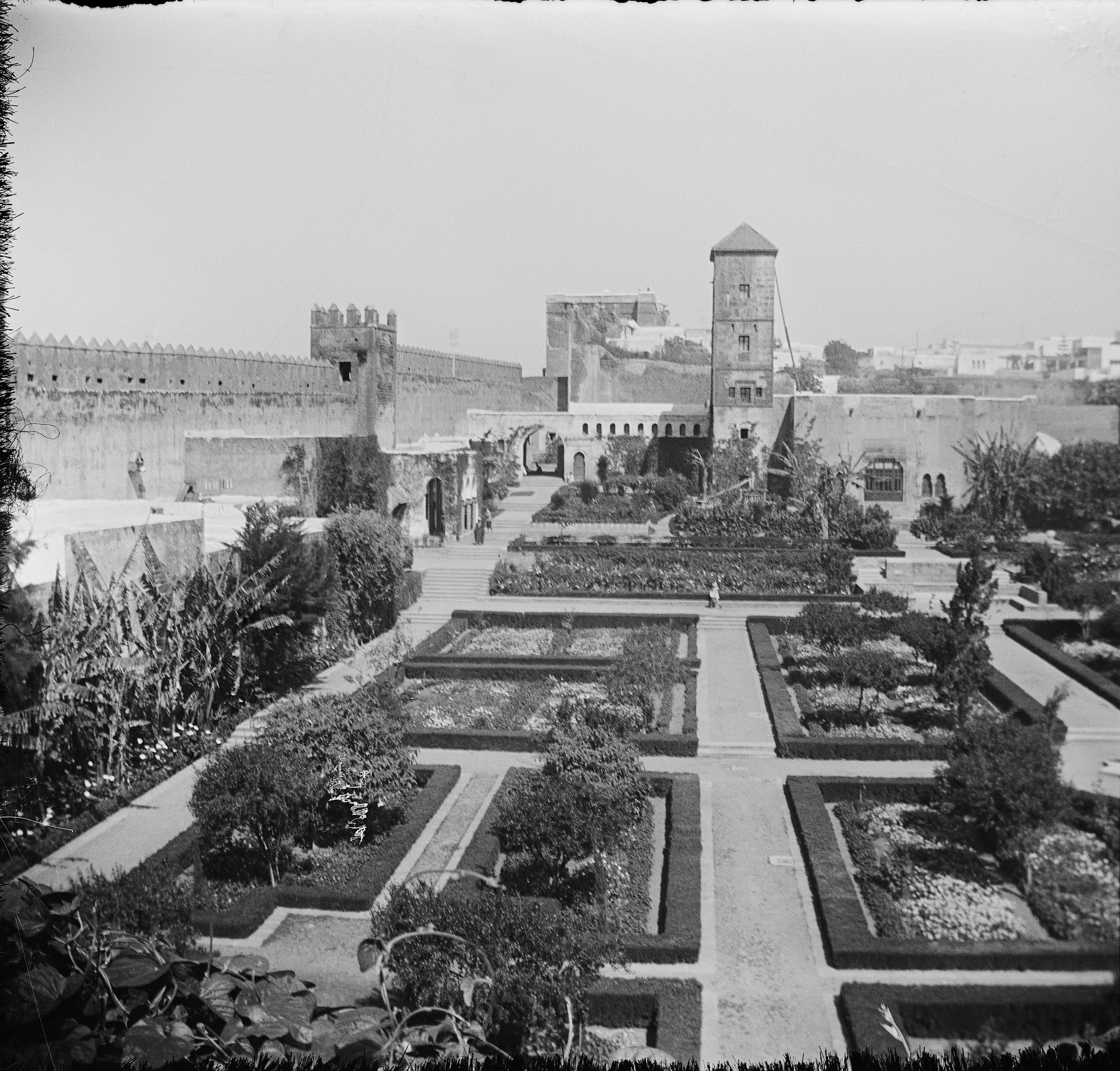
View of the Andalusian Gardens around 1920

== Current status ==
Today, the Kasbah remains a popular free tourist attraction within Rabat, offering scenic views of the waterfront of Rabat, the Bou Regreg river, neighboring Salé, and the Atlantic Ocean. It is mostly occupied as a residential neighborhood, known for its distinct blue and white walls. An unoccupied site adjacent to the Kasbah is used as one of the concert venues for the annual Mawazine music festival in Rabat.

== Gallery ==
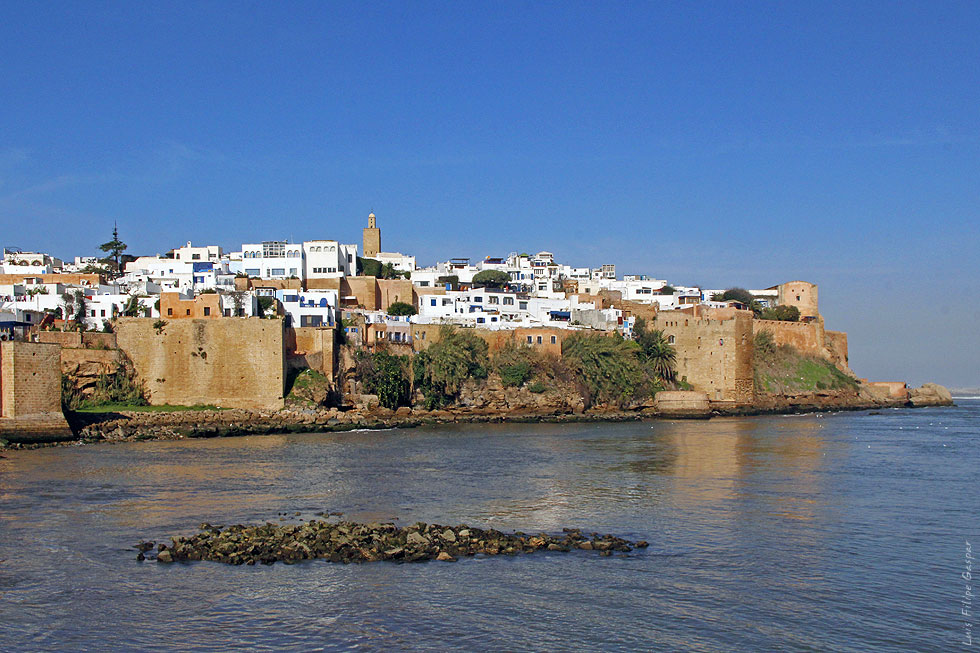
The Kasbah of the Udayas overlooking the Bou Regreg River

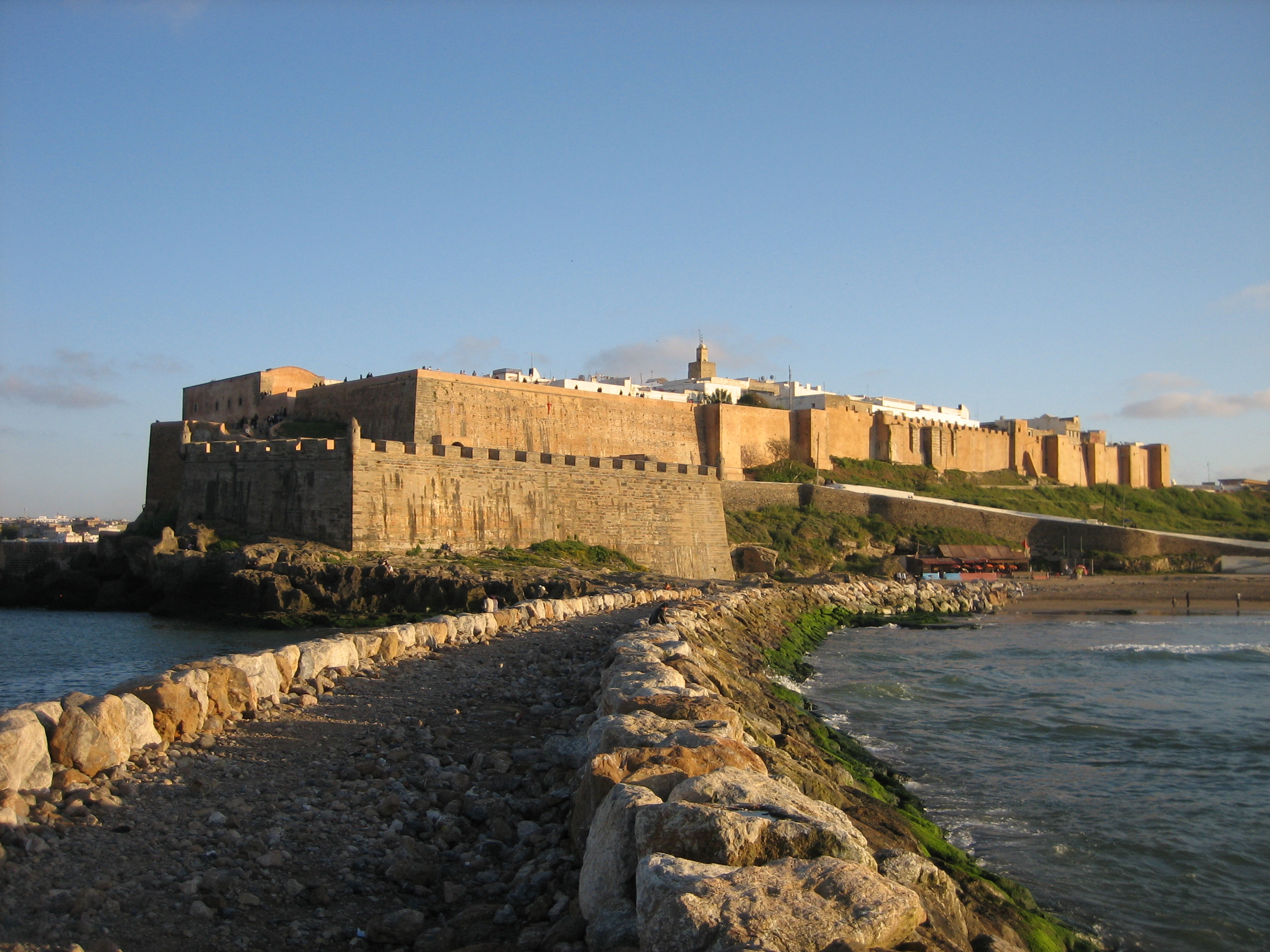
View of the Kasbah from the north

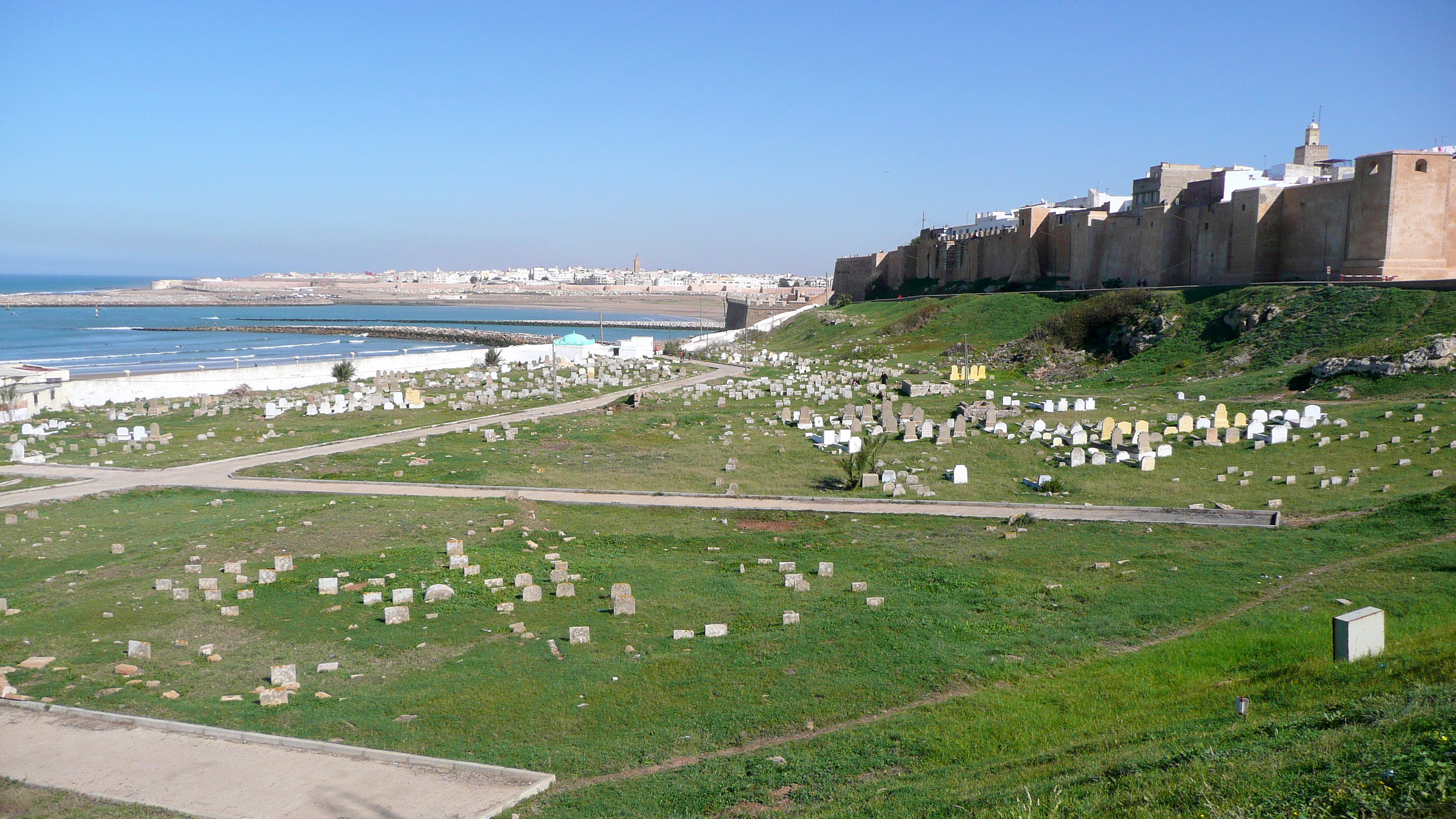
View of the kasbah from the northwest, with a nearby cemetery

View of the Kasbah from the south, including 18th-century walls

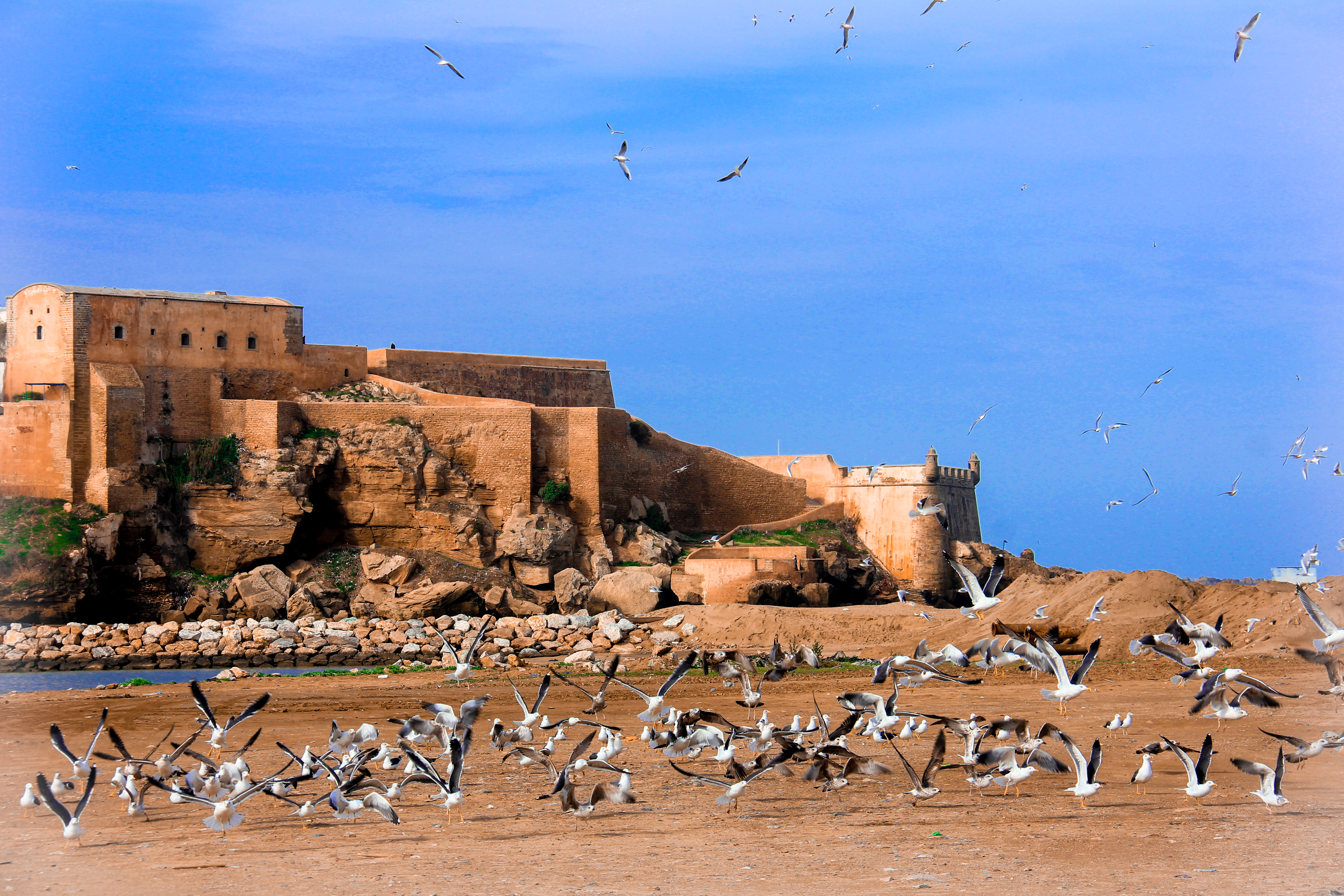
View of riverside fortifications, including the Sqala and the Corsairs' Tower on the right below the main semaphore platform above on the left

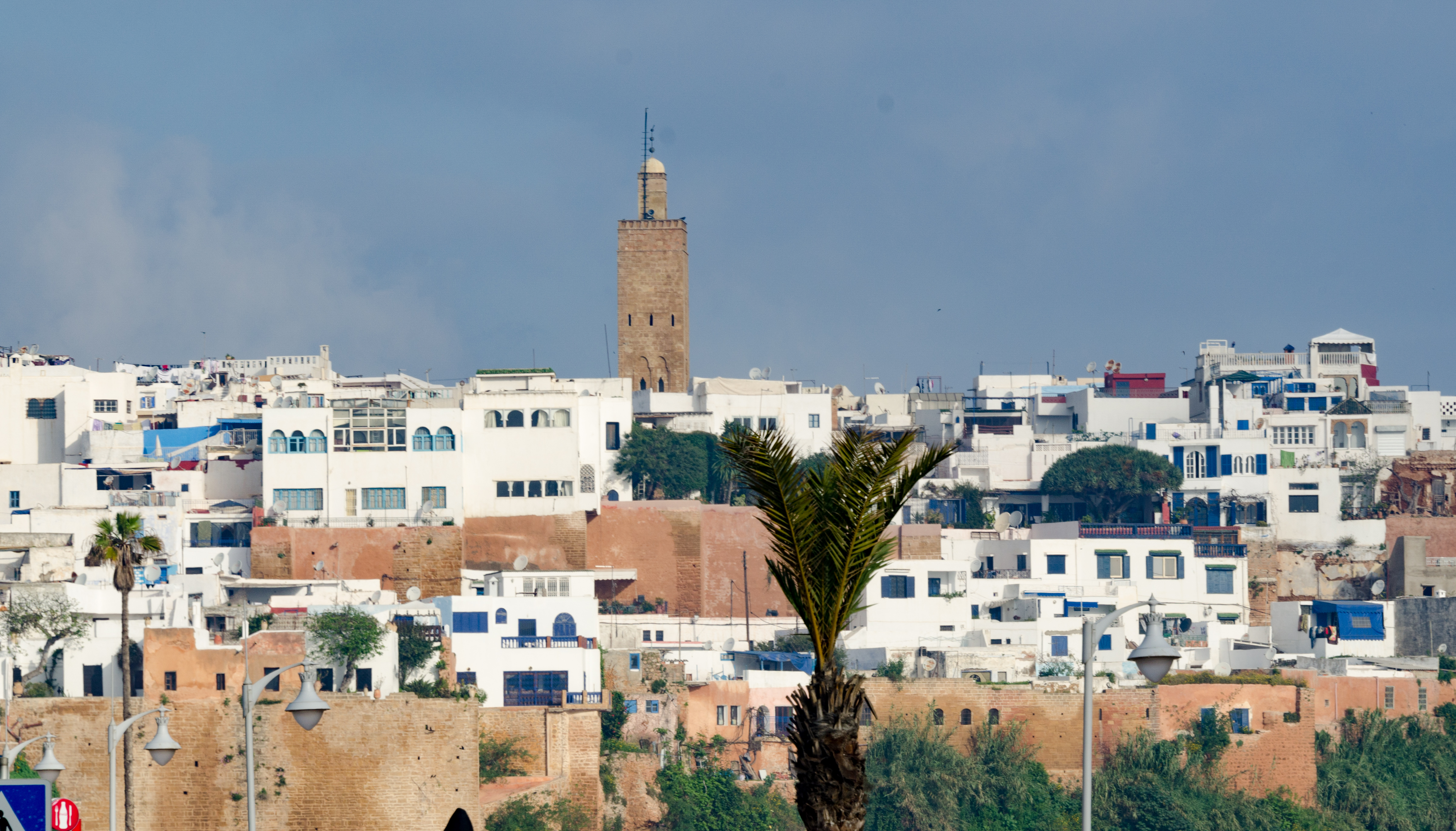
View of the Kasbah, including the minaret of the Old Mosque

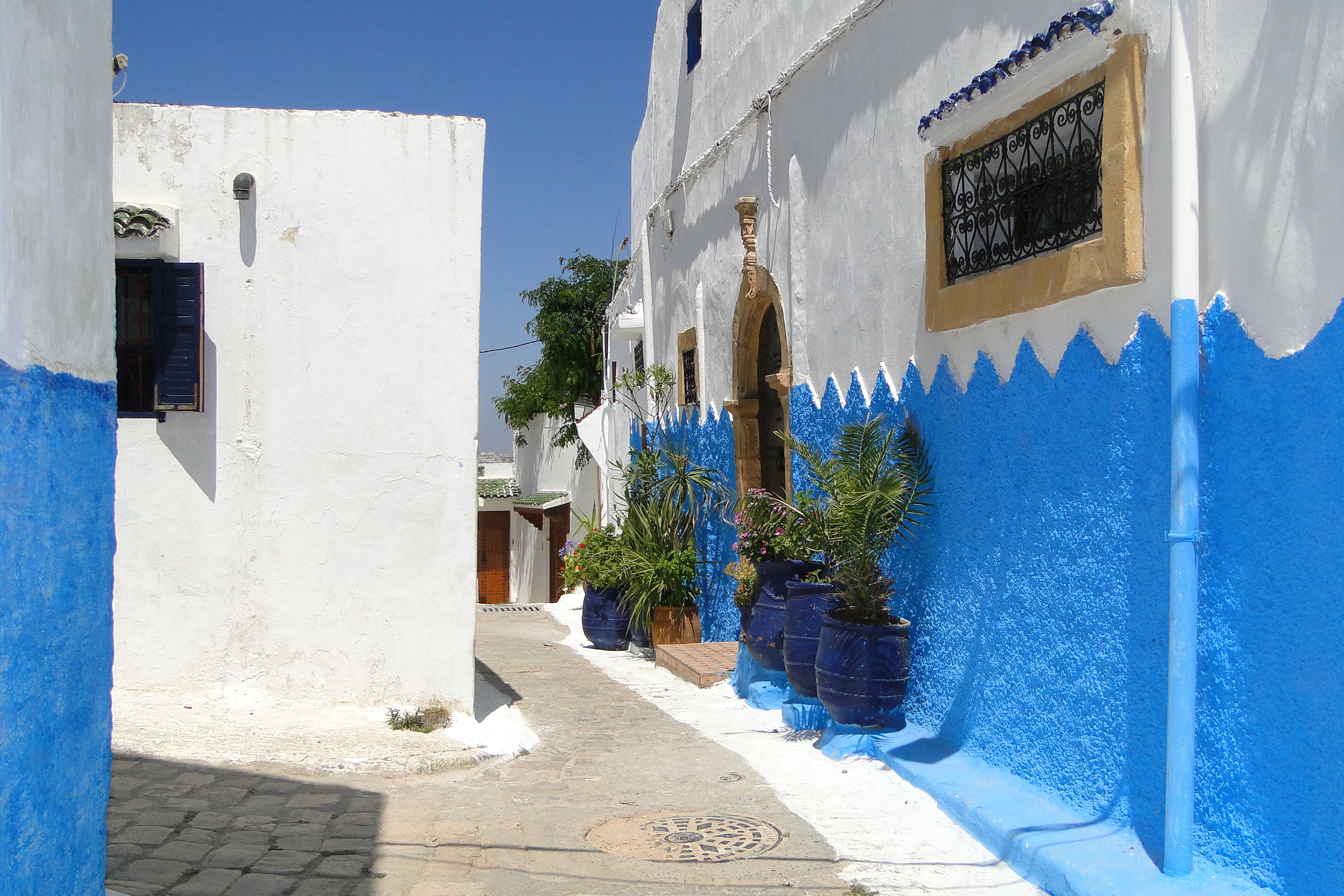
A typical street inside the kasbah today

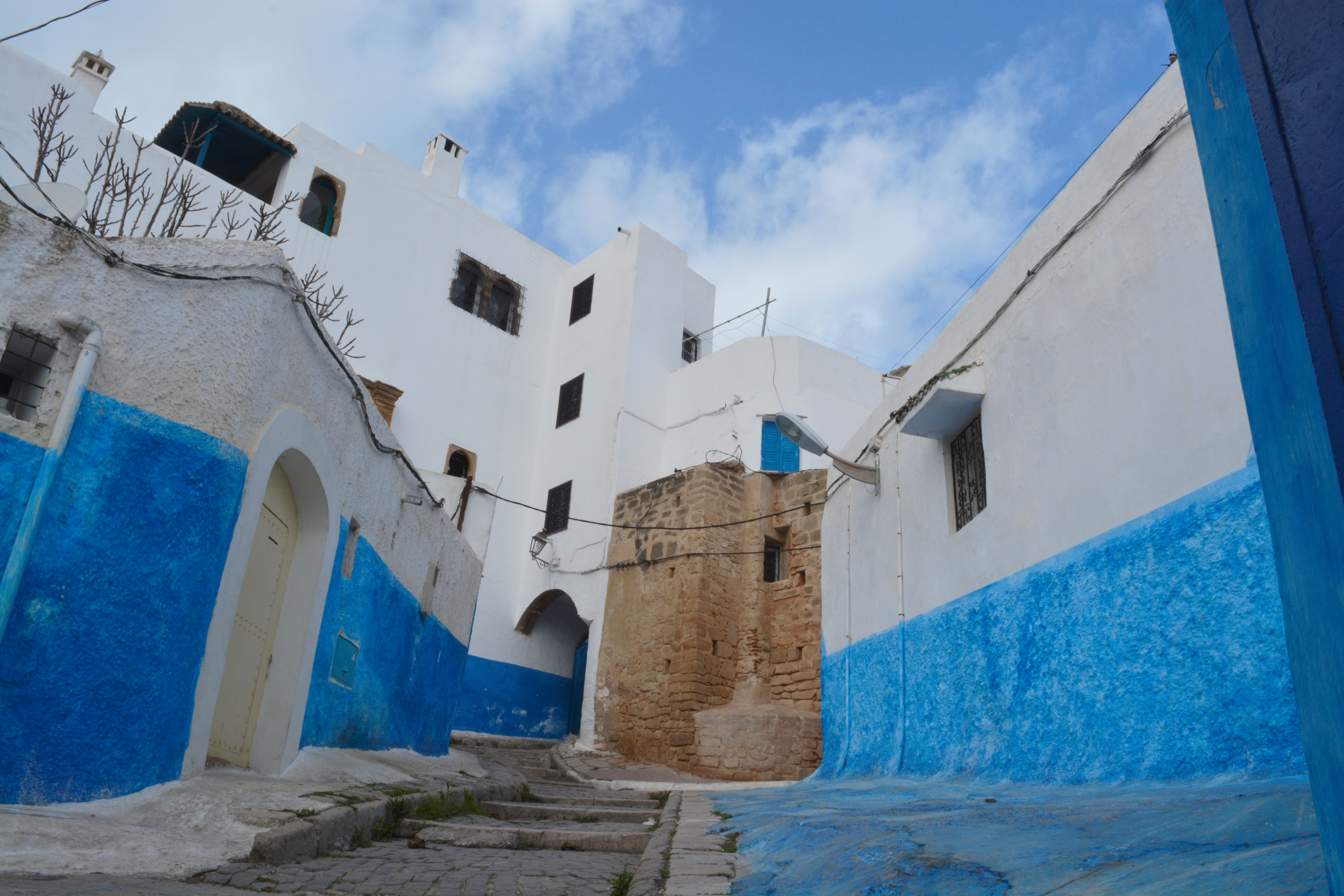
Another street (Rue Bazou) inside the kasbah, passing through an archway

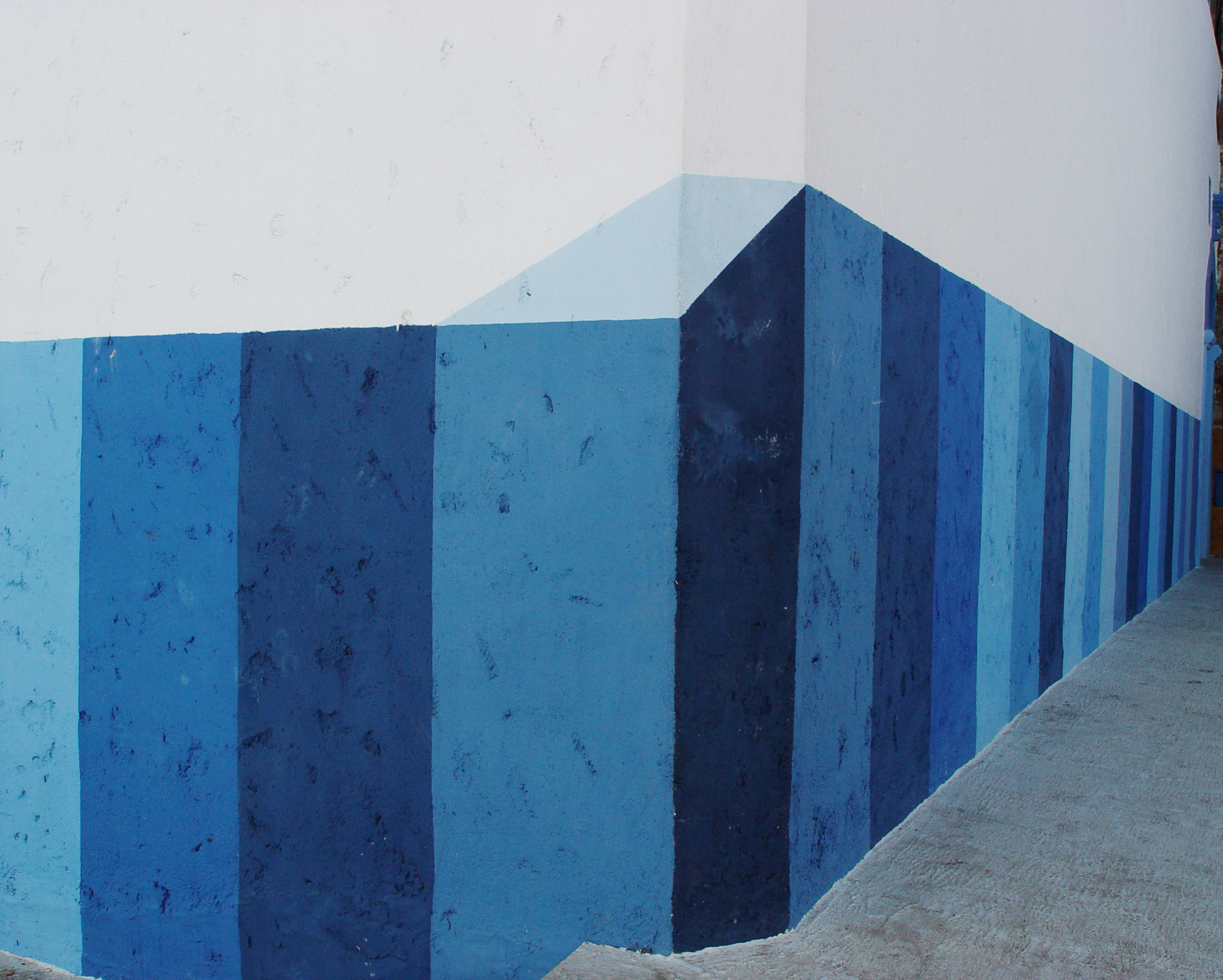
Optical illusion painted on corner of a house in the kasbah

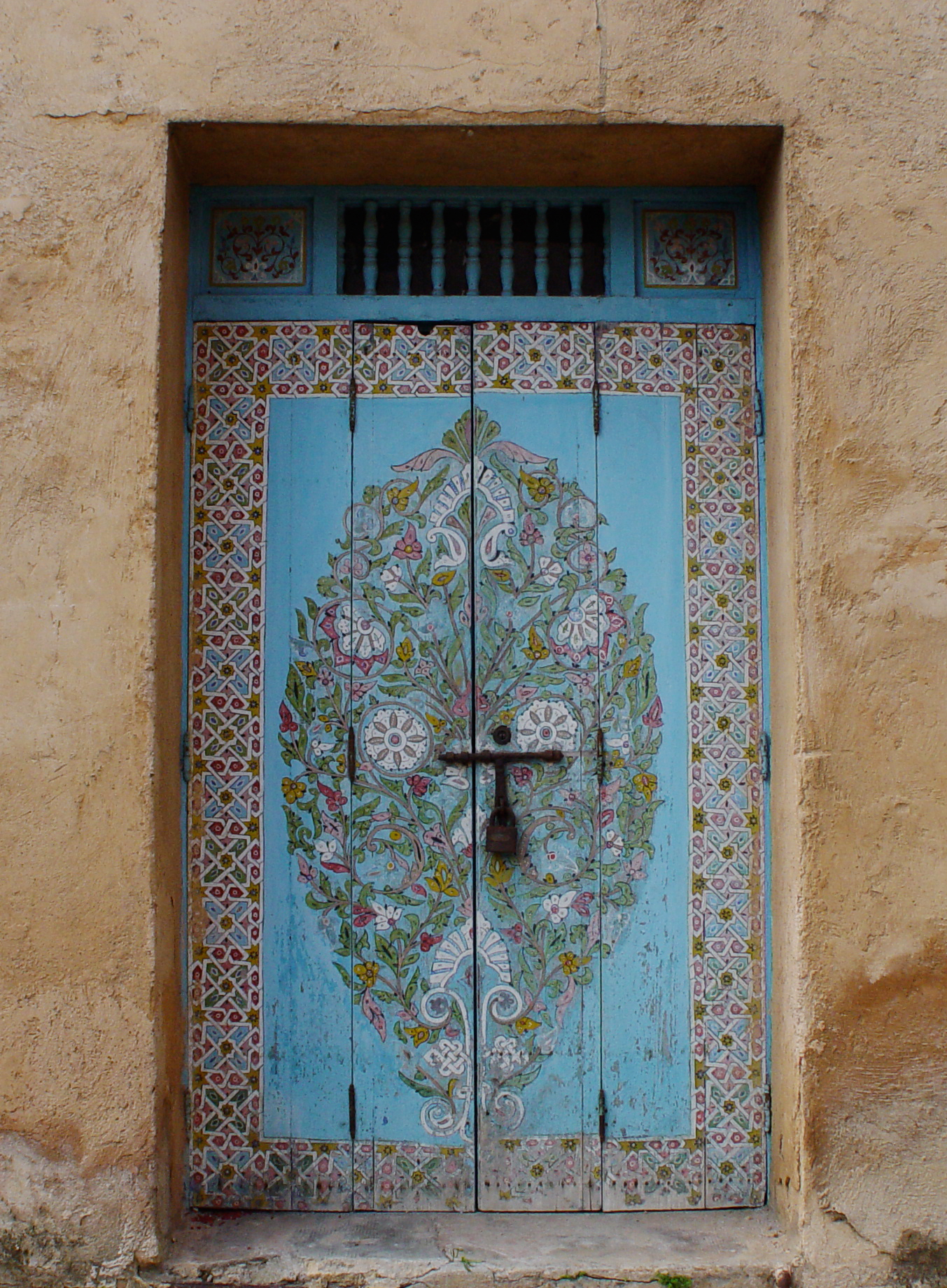
An ornately painted door in the kasbah, near the museum

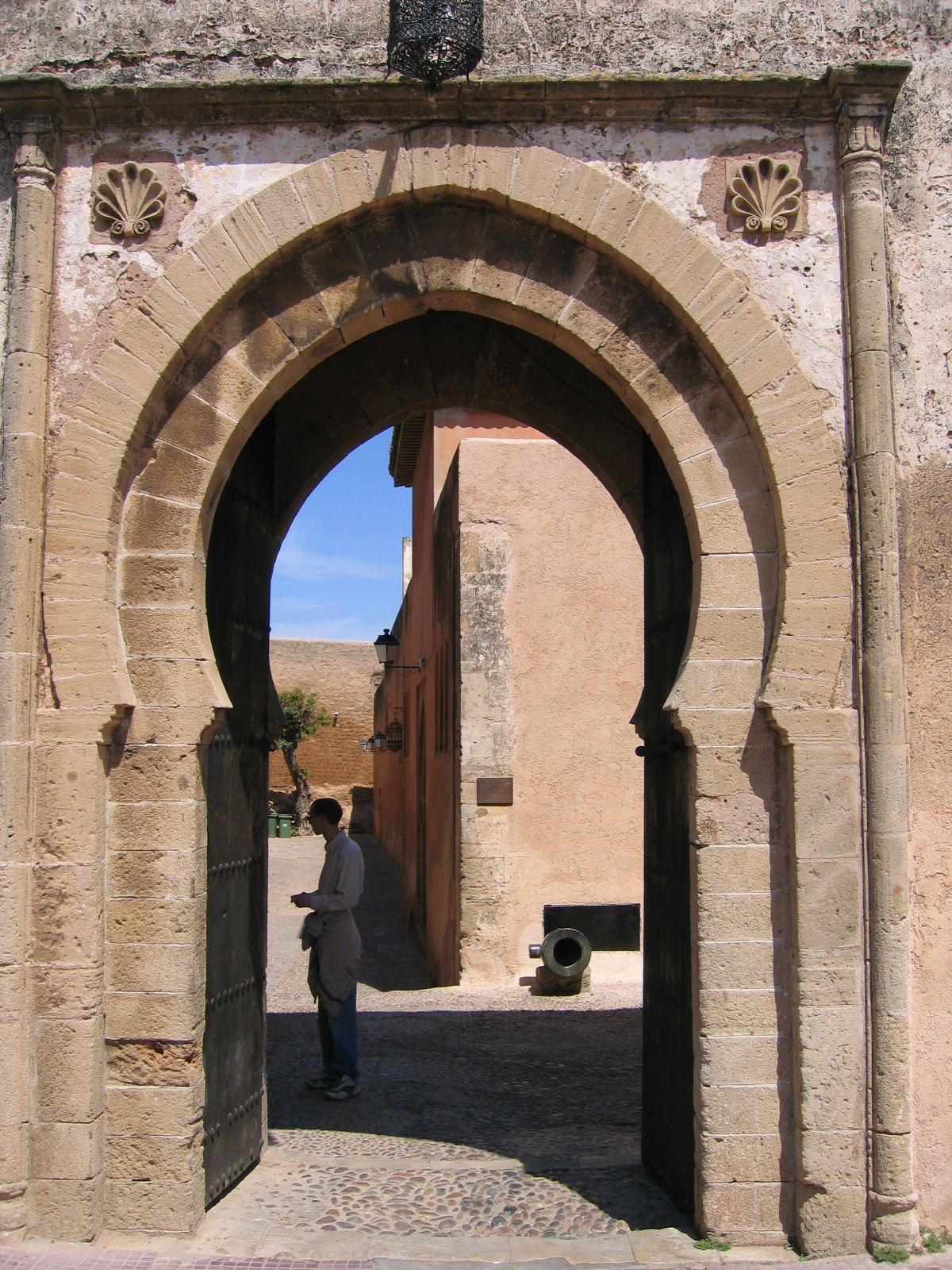
A gate in the kasbah's western wall near the Andalusian Gardens and the museum

== See also ==
- Lists of mosques
- List of mosques in Africa
- List of mosques in Morocco
