= Ma'azuza Malika =

Moroccan woman

- Spouse: Moulay Ismail
- Issue: Sultan Moulay Abdelmalek; Moulay Abd al Rahman; Moulay Hussein
- House: Alaouite (by marriage)
- Religion: Islam

Ma'azuza Malika (Arabic: معزوزة مالكة), was a Moroccan woman who lived between the 17th century and the 18th century. She was one of the wives of Moulay Ismail, Sultan of Morocco and the mother of Sultan Moulay Abdalmalik.

== Biography ==
Ma'azuza Malika, married Moulay Ismail around 1695. It is likely that she remained his wife until the end of the 1720s.

Her presence around the sovereign is attested by John Braithwaite, a member of the British consulate in Morocco, who explains that Ma'azuza was no longer in the favors of Moulay Ismail in the 1720s. This loss of favor can be explained by the fact that Ma'azuza could be the wife of Moulay Ismail who had an extramarital affair with a man from Adrar. Around the same period an embassy of dignitaries from Adrar as well as the emir of Trarza came to Marrakesh. One of them, Sidi Abdallah ould Rasga from Chinguetti, had an affair with a wife of Sultan Moulay Ismail. The two lovers had agreed on a stratagem to settle their meetings in secret. This love story is well known in Adrar.

== Descendance ==
Ma'azuza Malika and Moulay Ismail have as sons :

- Sultan Moulay Abdelmalek;
- Moulay Abd al Rahman;
- Moulay Hussein.
