= Lalla Umm al-Iz at-Taba =

Wife of Sultan Moulay Ismail

Umm al-Iz at-Taba
- Spouse: Moulay Ismail
- Issue: Moulay Abdallah
- House: Alaouite (by marriage)
- Religion: Islam

Um'el'Iz Tabba'a (Arabic: أم العز التباع) was one of the wives of Alaouite Sultan Moulay Ismail and the mother of Prince Moulay Abdallah (not to be confused with the latter's half-brother, Sultan Moulay Abdallah).

Um'el'Iz was fluent in English. She was a mediator for the trade agreement and the Anglo-Moroccan peace treaty signed in 1722, on which occasion she had written exchanges with Charles Stewart, the English ambassador, who had requested her help.
