= Halima Al Sufyaniyah =

Halima al-Sufyaniyah
- Spouse: Moulay Ismail
- Issue: Moulay Zeydan
- House: Alaouite (by marriage)
- Father: Sheikh Ali bin Hussein al-Sufiyani
- Religion: Islam

Lalla Halima al-Sufiyaniyah (Arabic: حليمة السفيانية) was one of the wives of Moulay Ismail and the mother of Prince Moulay Zeydan (not to confuse with Prince Moulay Mohammed Zeydan, the latter's older half-brother). Lalla Halima was very active in the socio-political life of Morocco during the reign of her husband, she oversaw army salaries, gifts protocol to the Ulamas, issued donations for schools and left a building heritage to Morocco.

== Life ==
Halima's father was Sheikh Ali bin Hussein al-Sufiyani, upon his death he left his daughter a considerable personal inheritance in Fez, great furniture which would have made anyone among the richest. She married Moulay Ismail around 1707 and henceforth became known as Princess Lalla Halima. she lived in the Palace of Sherrers, the royal harem where wives and concubines lived with their children. Around 1715, Thomas Pellow recorded Lalla Halima as Moulay Ismail's favorite wife and she remained so until her death. He also describes Lalla Halima as being particularly kind.

Kasbah Boulaouane was a fortress built by Moulay Ismail, it was also his palace of retreat from the court of Meknes as Inside the kasbah is a residential neighborhood called Dar al-Sultan. He spent his days at this kasbah regularly every year accompanied by his favorite wife Lalla Halima who was a noble lady of the Sufiyani tribe whose territory is where this fortress was built in Dukala. He would leave her there when court obligations required his return. When Lalla Halima died, her husband Moulay Ismail was so overwhelmed with sorrow that he never visited the Kasbah again.
