= Abdallah of Morocco =

Sultan of Morocco six times from 1729 to 1757

Moulay Abdallah
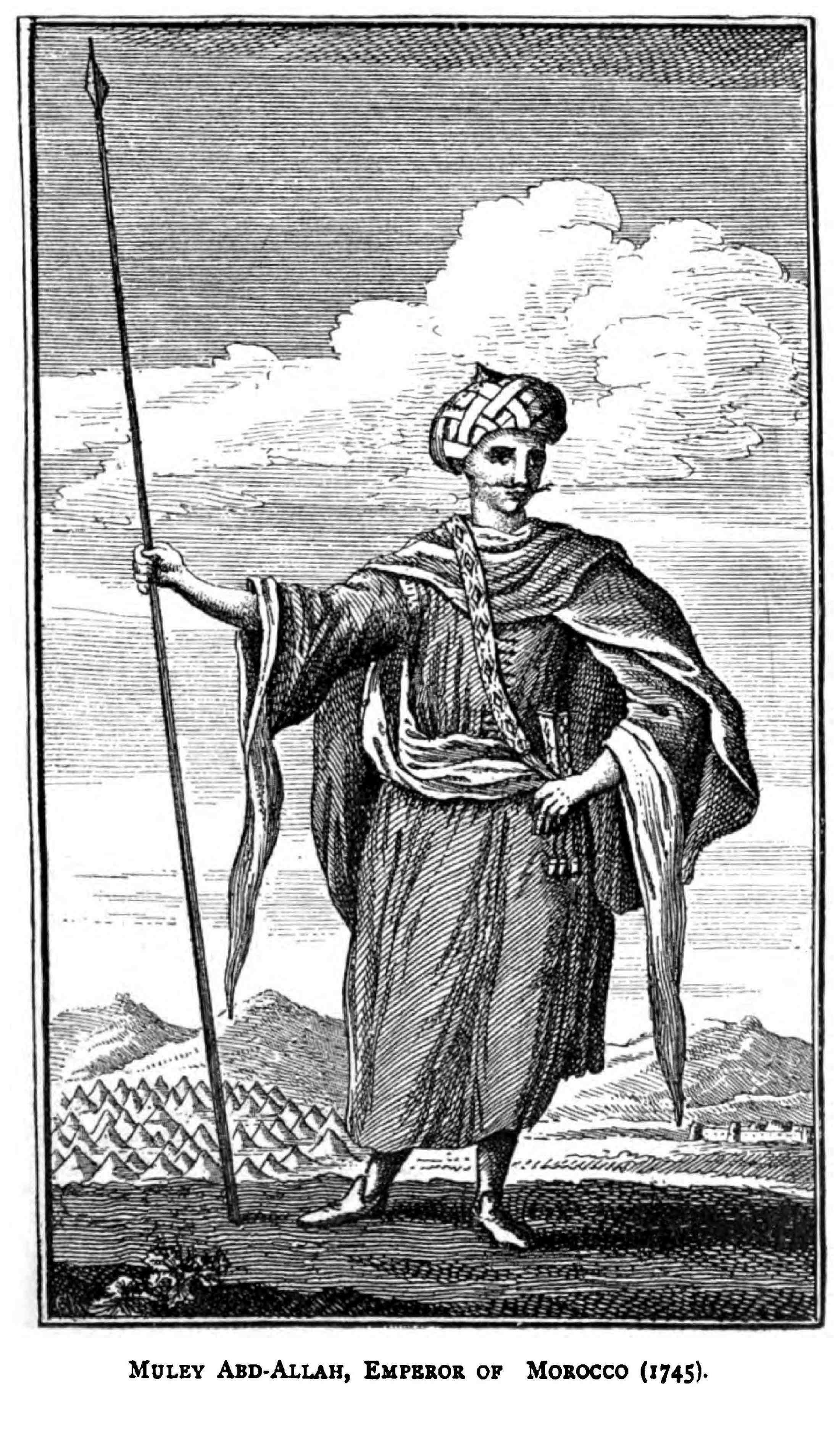
- Frontispiece illustrating Sultan Moulay Abdallah from Thomas Pellow's slave narrative (1890)

Sultan of Morocco
- Reign: 1729–1734
- Predecessor: Abu'l Abbas Ahmad II
- Successor: Ali
- Reign: 1736–1736, 1740–1741, 1741–1742, 1743–1747, 1748–1757
- Predecessor: Abdalmalik
- Successor: Sidi Mohammed III
- Born: 1694; Meknes, Morocco
- Died: 10 November 1757 (aged 62–63); Dar Dbibegh, Morocco
- Burial: Moulay Abdallah Mosque; Fes Jdid, Morocco
- Issue: Moulay Ahmed; Sidi Mohammed III
- Moulay Abdallah bin arbia bin Ismail as-Thamin
- House: Alaouite dynasty
- Father: Ismail Ibn Sharif
- Mother: Khanatha bint Bakkar

Moulay Abdallah (1694 – 10 November 1757) (Arabic: مولاي عبدالله بن إسماعيل) was the Sultan of Morocco six times between 1729 and 1757. He ascended the throne in the years 1729–1734, 1736, 1740–1741, 1741–1742, 1743–1747 and 1748–1757. He was a son of Sultan Ismail Ibn Sharif.

== Life ==
He was born in 1694 to Sultan Moulay Ismail and one of his wives Lalla Khanatha bint Bakkar. He ascended the throne numerous times, fighting his half-brothers. He was first proclaimed sultan after the death of his half-brother Sultan Moulay Ahmad on 5 March 1729. The Abids, the Udayas, all the caids gathered and agreed to proclaim him the new sultan of Morocco. They sent a troop of horsemen to fetch for him in Sijilmasa where he resided. At the same time, they wrote to the Ulemas of Fez inviting them to pledge the Bay'ah to Moulay Abdallah, which they agreed to.

Moulay Abdallah favorable of his proclamation traveled to Fez for his Bay'ah which was planned to take place at the Zawiya of Moulay Idris II in Fes el Bali. With his court and escort Moulay Abdallah made grand entrance from the Bab Ftouh gate, but a man of his escort Hamdoun Errousi - whom the Fassi recognized and were chasing after for killing one of theirs - slandered the entire population of Fez before him, and having heard that Moulay Abdallah immediately doubled back to Fes Jdid leaving everyone confused. His Bay'ah thus took place in Fes Jdid and was led by fiqh Abul'Ula Idris ben Elmehdi Elmechchat Elmouâfi.

Moulay Abdallah was first deposed in 1734 by the Abid Al-Bukhari who secretly were plotting his deposition and assassination. Upon hearing of their plan he managed to save his life by taking flight South of his Meknes Royal Palace to reach safety in Oued Noun, the seat of his maternal family. He took refuge with his maternal uncles the M'gharfa and stayed there with his sons, Moulay Ahmed and the young Sidi Mohammed for more than three years until he was called again to seat the throne for the second time.

Sultan Moulay Abdallah was proclaimed respectively 5 March 1729 (deposed 28 September 1734), 14 February/23 May 1736 (deposed again 8 August 1736), February 1740 (deposed again 13 June 1741), 24 November 1741 (deposed again 3 February 1742), May 1743 (deposed once more in 1747), and October 1748. He died on the throne on November 10, 1757, after nine years of uninterrupted reign at Dar Debibagh, a fortified palace he built in 1729.

Moulay Abdallah married a woman of the Cheraga tribe among their children was his successor Sidi Mohammed III. Unlike his father before him, Sultan Moulay Abdallah did not father a plethora of sons, therefore it was the smoothest succession Morocco had known since Ahmad al-Mansur of the Sa'adi dynasty.

After his death, he was buried in the royal necropolis of the Moulay Abdallah Mosque which he had built in Fes el-Jdid.

Preceded by Abu'l Abbas Ahmad II	Sultan of Morocco; 1729–1757	Succeeded by Ali of Morocco
Preceded by Ali of Morocco	Sultan of Morocco; 1736	Succeeded by Sidi Mohammed III
