= Abdalmalik of Morocco =

Moulay Abdelmalik

King of Morocco
- Reign: 1728 - 1729
- Predecessor: Moulay Ahmad Ad Dhahabi
- Successor: Moulay Ahmad Ad Dhahabi
- Born: 1675
- Died: 2 March 1729 (aged 53–54); Meknes, Morocco
Names
- Moulay Abdelmalek ibn Ismail
- House: 'Alawi dynasty
- Father: Ismail Ibn Sharif
- Mother: Ma'azuza Malika
- Religion: Sunni Islam

Sultan Moulay Abdelmalik (Arabic: عبد الملك بن إسماعيل العلوي) (1675 – 2 March 1729) was Sultan of Morocco from March 1728 to March 1729 and a member of the Alaouite dynasty.

== Reign ==
A son of Sultan Moulay Ismail and Ma'azuza Malika, Moulay Abdalmalik was earmarked as his father's successor until he fell from favour and was replaced as heir by his two years younger half-brother Moulay Ahmad al-Dhahbi in 1727. Moulay Ahmad al-Dhahbi proved quite ineffective as a ruler, and when it became public that he was a drunkard, he was overthrown in a coup instigated by his own wives. Moulay Abdelmalik was proclaimed Sultan in March 1729, but failed to prevent his brother's escape and made the mistake of criticising the fiercely loyal bukhari (the imperial black bodyguards). The bukhari then threw their support behind the ousted Ahmad ed Dhahbi, thus throwing Morocco into yet another civil war.

A compromise was reached between the brothers after bloody fighting, splitting Morocco into two kingdoms. Ahmed ed Dehebi was to have Meknes for his capital while Abdelmalik was to rule from Fez. Not content with this however, Abdelmalik arranged a face-to-face meeting with his brother with the intention of assassinating him.

The attempt failed and Abdelmalik was sent off under guard in Meknes, imprisoned in the house of bacha Msâhel where he was later strangled during the night March 2, 1729, three days before Moulay Ahmad al-Dhahbi died.

Preceded by Moulay Ahmad Ad Dhahabi	Sultan of Morocco; 1728–1729	Succeeded by Moulay Ahmad Ad Dhahabi
