= Qara Prison =

Historical underground vault and prison in Morocco

- حبس قارا
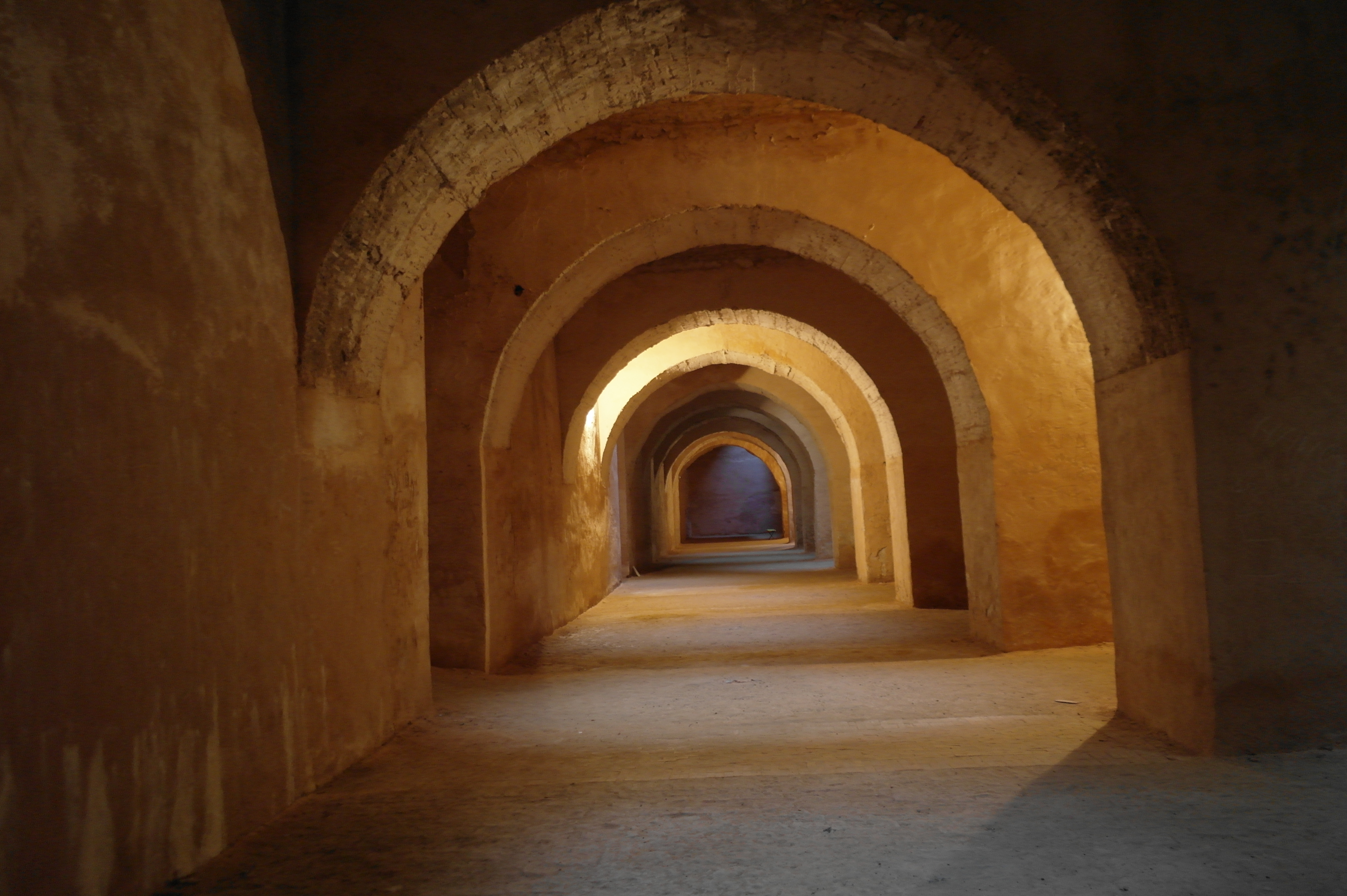
- View of the underground chambers
- Interactive map of Qara Prison
- Location: Meknes, Morocco
- Type: storage place, underground vault, prison
- Beginning date: early 18th century
- Completion date: 18th century

Qara Prison or Habs Qara (Moroccan Arabic: حبس قارا; also Moroccan Arabic: حبس د النصارى, lit. 'Prison of the Christians'), also known as the Prison of the Christian Slaves, is a series of underground vaulted chambers built in the early 18th century in Meknes, Morocco, by order of Sultan Moulay Ismail. Although popularly described as an underground prison that could host thousands of inmates, mostly Europeans captured at sea, most scholars agree that its function was to serve as a vast storage space for the royal complex of the Kasbah of Moulay Ismail.

== Name ==
According to one account, Qara Prison was named after a Portuguese architect, who was reportedly a prisoner himself, and designed the place for Sultan Moulay Ismail in exchange for his freedom. Another account says that the location was only named thus during the French occupation and that the appellation derives from the nickname of the prison guard who was reportedly bald (Moroccan Arabic: قرع qrəɛ).

In Arabic the chambers are also known as "the cellar" (Arabic: السرداب) or "the passageway" (Arabic: الدهليز).

== History ==
Qara "prison" was built as part of the Kasbah of Moulay Ismail, the royal complex that served as capital to Sultan Moulay Ismail of Morocco. Moulay Ismail chose Meknes, a city that held no special significance intellectually or politically prior to his reign, for strategic reasons, and possibly to leave his own fingerprint as monarch, outside of the shadow of preceding Moroccan dynasties. Prisoners and slaves were used in the construction of the underground vault and the wider complex, although scholarly studies have estimated that they were only a small part of the total workforce.

Under the French Protectorate, the location was occasionally used to detain members of the Moroccan resistance. Some of its passages were sealed with cement by the French authorities to prevent people from getting lost.

== Architecture and extent ==
The underground vaults are located right under the square in front of Qubbat al-Khayyatin. The accessible parts include three large rooms with massive pillars. The rest was blocked by the authorities, due to several incidents of lost adventurers and explorers. Several underground vaults exist under the whole complex of the Kasbah of Moulay Ismail, and it is unknown whether they are connected with each other.

According to Moroccan historian Ibn Zaydan, its structure was strong and resilient since "riders passed on top of it, beasts of burden dragged big rocks, and loaded vapor vehicles drove night and day above it, and even gardens with big trees were planted and often irrigated, with no effect on its build".

The underground vaults were likely not dug, but rather built first then the Kasbah buildings were constructed on top.

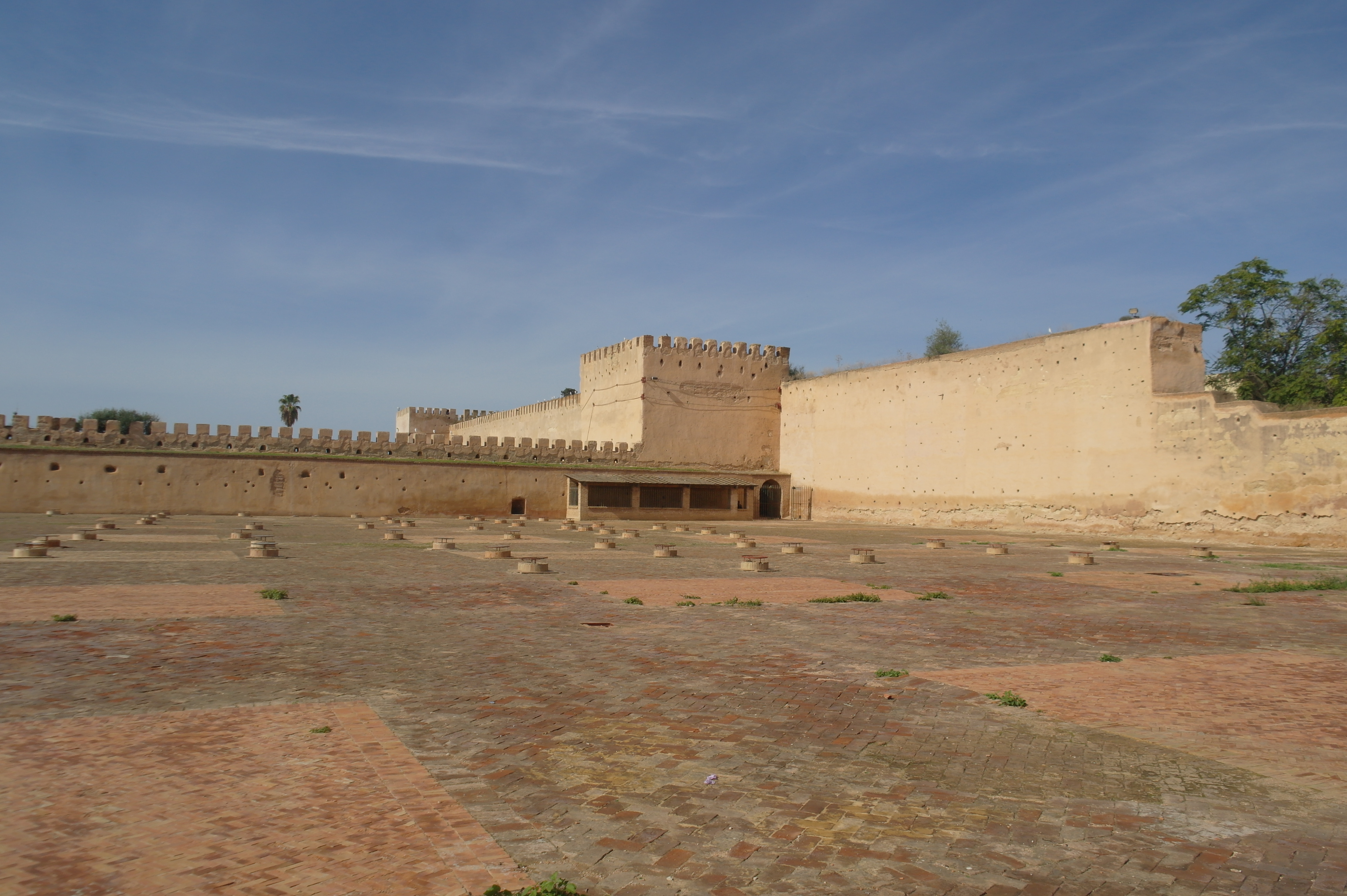
The plaza on the surface above the chambers

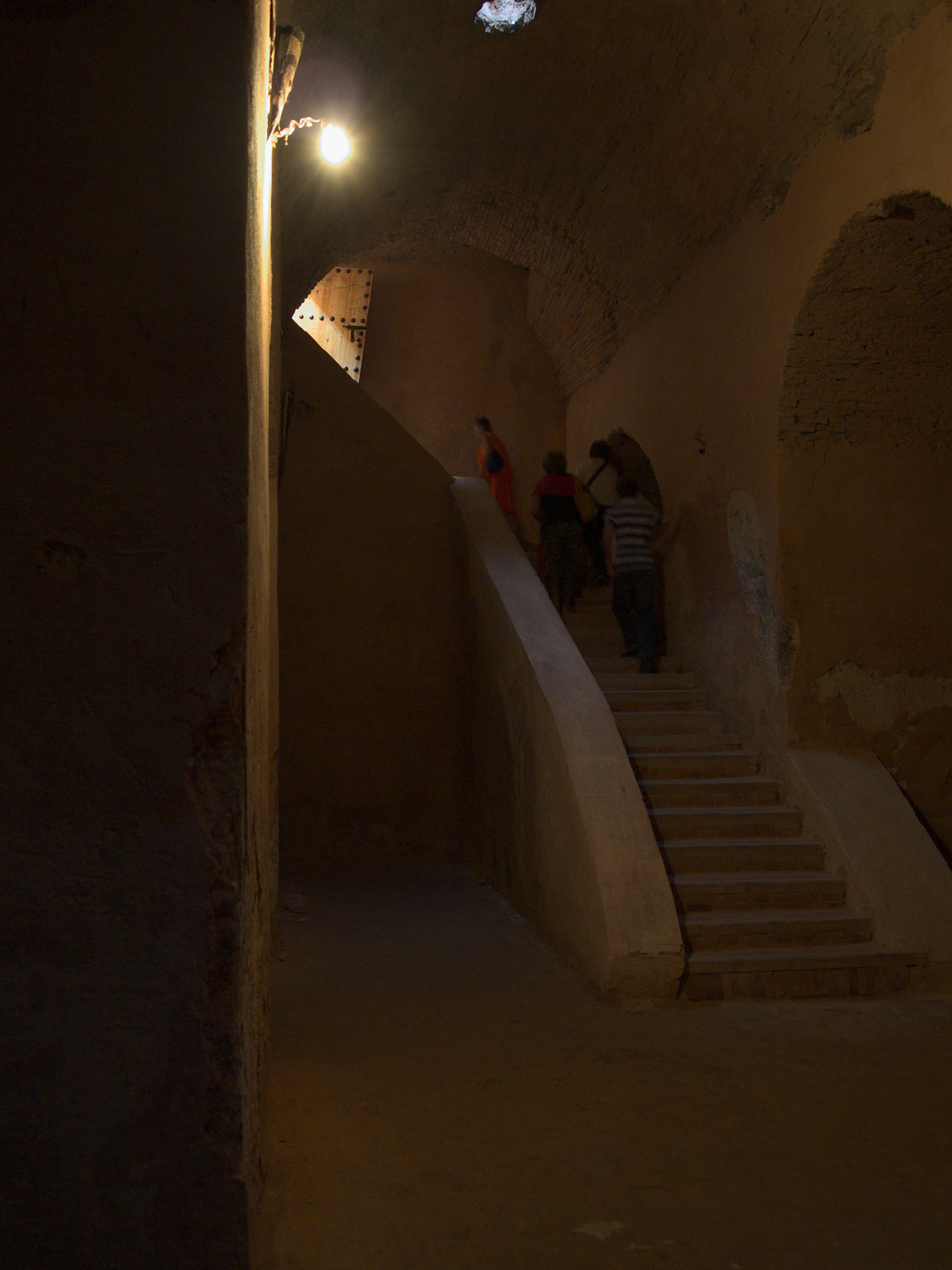
Staircase used by visitors today to enter the chambers

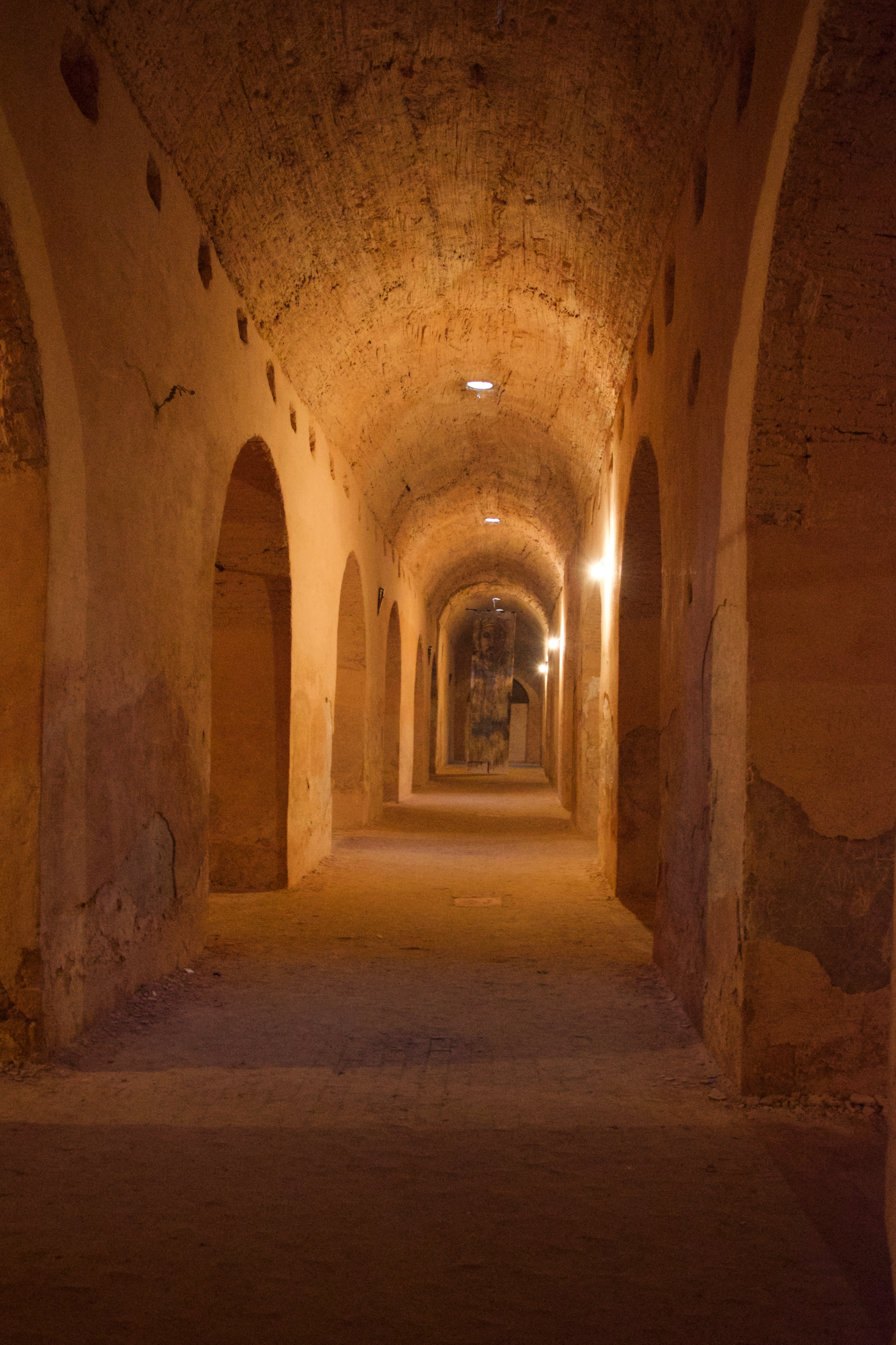
One of the vaulted aisles inside the chamber

== Urban legends ==
Popular myths about the place would have it extend below all of Meknes, or even until nearby or, in more outlandish accounts, far away cities like Marrakesh or Taza. The number of Christian prisoners in Meknes during Moulay Ismail's reign was also often exaggerated by European as well as Moroccan accounts. Their actual numbers were probably between 500 and 800. Another common myth was that it had no doors and windows, and its only point of access was a roof opening. The place was reportedly "cursed" by the evil spirits of the prisoners who died there. A legend has it that Moulay Ismail had designed a secret escape route, and that those who could find it were rewarded with their freedom.
