= Ismail Ibn Sharif =

Sultan of Morocco from 1672 to 1727

Moulay Ismail Ibn Sharif مولاي إسماعيل بن الشريف
- Amir al-Mu'minin
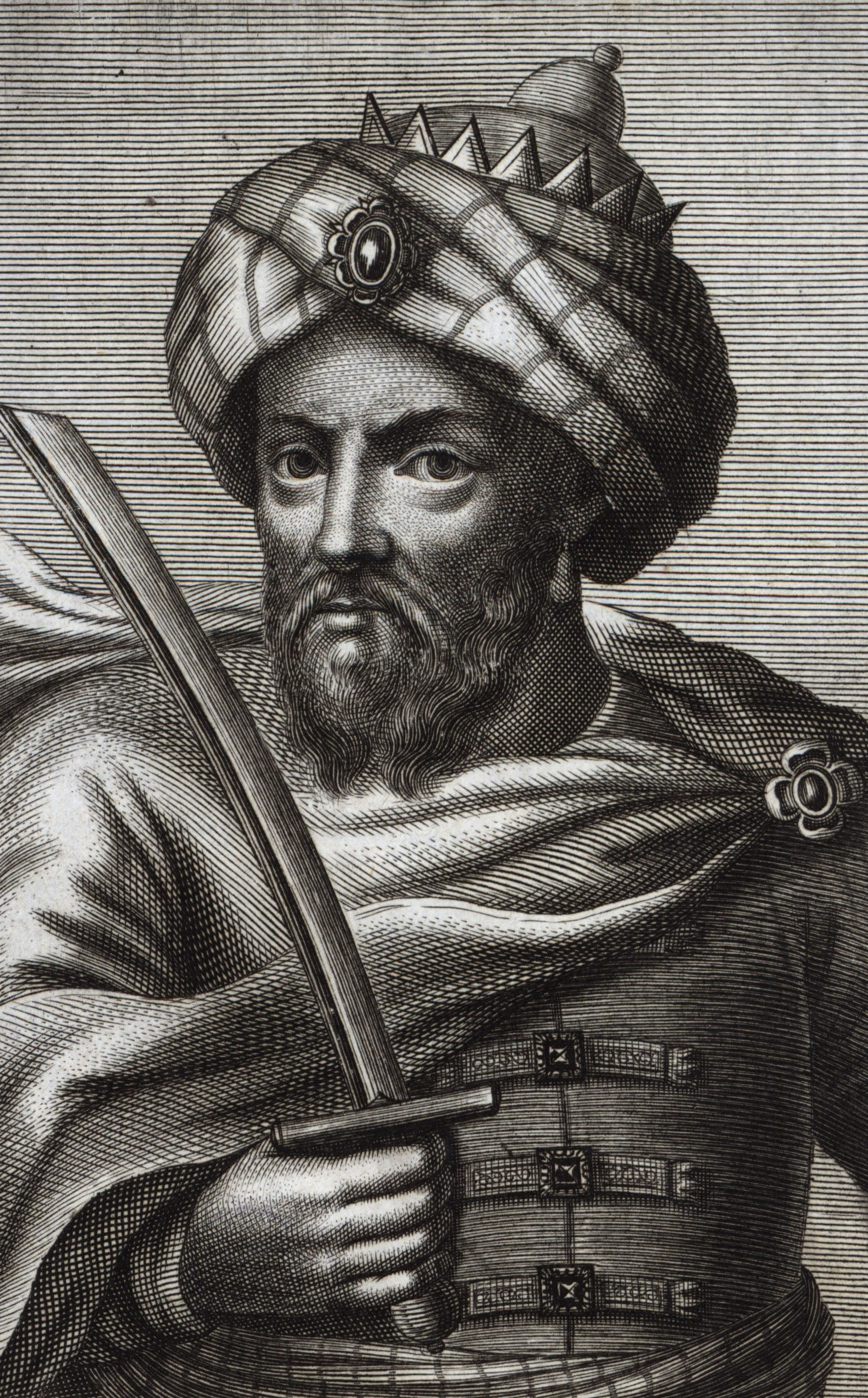
- Illustration of Moulay Ismail by Germain Moüette, c. 1683

Sultan of Morocco
- Reign: 1672–1727
- Coronation: 14 April 1672
- Predecessor: Al-Rashid Ibn Sharif
- Successor: Abu'l Abbas Ahmad Ibn Ismail

Governor of Fez
- Reign: 1667–1672
- Born: c. 1645; Sijilmassa, Saadi Sultanate (Morocco)
- Died: 22 March 1727 (aged 81–82); Meknes, Alawi Sultanate (Morocco)
- Burial: Mausoleum of Moulay Ismail, Meknes
- Spouse: Among others: Lalla Aisha Mubarka; Khanatha bint Bakkar; Ma'azuza Malika; Alwa Benabiz; Aouda Doukalia; Nassira el-Salwi bint Mohammed el-Heyba; Halima Al Sufyaniyah; Lalla Umm al-Iz at-Taba
- Issue: Among 525 sons and 343 daughters: Moulay Mohammed Zeydan; Lalla Sitt al-Mulk; Moulay Abdalmalik; Moulay Ahmed; Moulay Abdallah
Names
- Abu 'l-Nasr Moulay Ismail I Ibn Sharif Ibn Ali
Era dates
- (17th–18th Centuries)
- House: 'Alawi dynasty
- Father: Sharif ibn Ali
- Mother: Mubarka bint Yark al-Maghfiri
- Religion: Sunni Islam

Moulay Ismail Ibn Sharif (Arabic: أبو النَّصْرِ مولاي إسماعيل بن الشريف, romanized: Abu 'l-Naṣr Mawlāy Ismāʿīl ibn al-Sharīf, c. 1645 – 22 March 1727) was a Sultan of Morocco from 1672 to 1727, as the second ruler of the 'Alawi dynasty. He was the seventh son of Moulay Sharif and was governor of the province of Fez and the north of Morocco from 1667 until the death of his half-brother, Sultan Moulay Rashid in 1672. He was proclaimed sultan at Fez, but spent several years in conflict with his nephew Moulay Ahmed ben Mehrez, who also claimed the throne, until the latter's death in 1687. Moulay Ismail's 55-year reign is the longest of any sultan of Morocco. During his lifetime, Isma'il amassed a harem of over 500 women with more than 800 confirmed biological children, making him one of the most prodigious fathers in recorded history.

The reign of Moulay Ismail marked a high watermark for Moroccan power. His military successes are explained by the creation of a strong army, originally relying on the 'Guichs' (especially the Udaya) and on the Black Guard (or Abid al-Bukhari), black slaves who were totally devoted to him. As a result, the central power could be less reliant on tribes that often rebelled. Moulay Ismail failed against the Ottoman Regency of Algiers during the Battle of Moulouya in 1692, as he tried to expand his territory towards Tlemcen. Moulay Ismail once again attempted to capture Oran, which was under Spanish rule, he had some success in pushing back the tribes of the Regency of Algiers until the Algerian Bey Mustapha cooperated with the Spaniards in pushing back Moulay Ismail's army. Moulay Ismail engaged in the Maghrebi War against the Regency of Algiers, he was successful in conquering the Western Beylik, he even looted the palace of the Bey. His army was subsequently pushed back in the Battle of Chelif in 1701. He participated in other minor battles such as Laghouat in 1708 which ended successfully. He expelled the Europeans from the ports they had occupied: Larache, Asilah, Mehdya, and Tangier. He took thousands of Christians prisoner and nearly took Ceuta.

Ismail controlled a fleet of corsairs based at Salé-le-Vieux and Salé-le-Neuf (now Rabat), which supplied him with European Christian slaves and weapons through their raids in the Mediterranean and all the way to the Black Sea. He established significant diplomatic relations with foreign powers, especially the Kingdom of France, Great Britain, and Spain. Often compared to his contemporary, Louis XIV, due to his charisma and authority, Moulay Ismail was nicknamed the 'bloody king' by the Europeans due to his extreme cruelty and exaction of summary justice upon his Christian slaves. He is also known in his native country as the "Warrior King".

He also made Meknes his capital and undertook the construction of an enormous citadel and palace complex next to its old city which included several grand residences, gardens, monumental gates, mosques, and more than forty kilometers of walls. He died following a sickness. After his death, his supporters became so powerful that they controlled the country, enthroning and dethroning the sultans at will.

== Biography ==
=== Background, early life, and accession to power ===
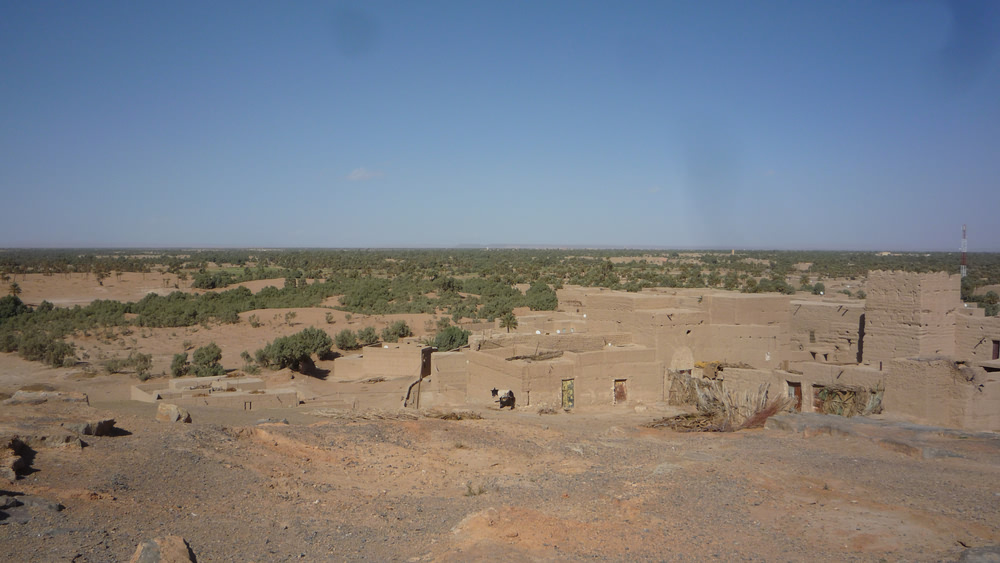
Tafilalt, seat of the Alaouite Sharifs from the 13th century

Born in 1645 at Sijilmassa, Moulay Ismail ben Sharif was the son of Sharif ibn Ali, Emir of Tafilalt and first sovereign of the 'Alawi dynasty. His clan claimed descent from Hassan Ad-Dakhil, a 21st generation descendant of the Islamic prophet Muhammad.

According to Al-Istiqsa, his mother was Mubarka bin Yark al-Maghfiri (d. 1668). (Note: El Hamel 2014, pp. 160, 164) According to the historian Ibn Zaydan, she was a black slave belonging to the Saharan Mghafra tribe (direct cousins of the Oudaya tribe as a cadet branch of it) rather than a member of it by blood or milk. She was reportedly given as a concubine to Sharif ibn Ali by Sidi Ali Bou Dmia, when he was holding him in captivity under ransom. This remains contested, as it would have made his birthdate in 1637 around the time his father was captive, while he was born in 1645. Moulay Ismail claimed a fictive kinship with the Oudaya by referring to them as his maternal uncles even though Mubarka was, according to Ibn Zaydan, not related to the Oudaya by blood or milk.

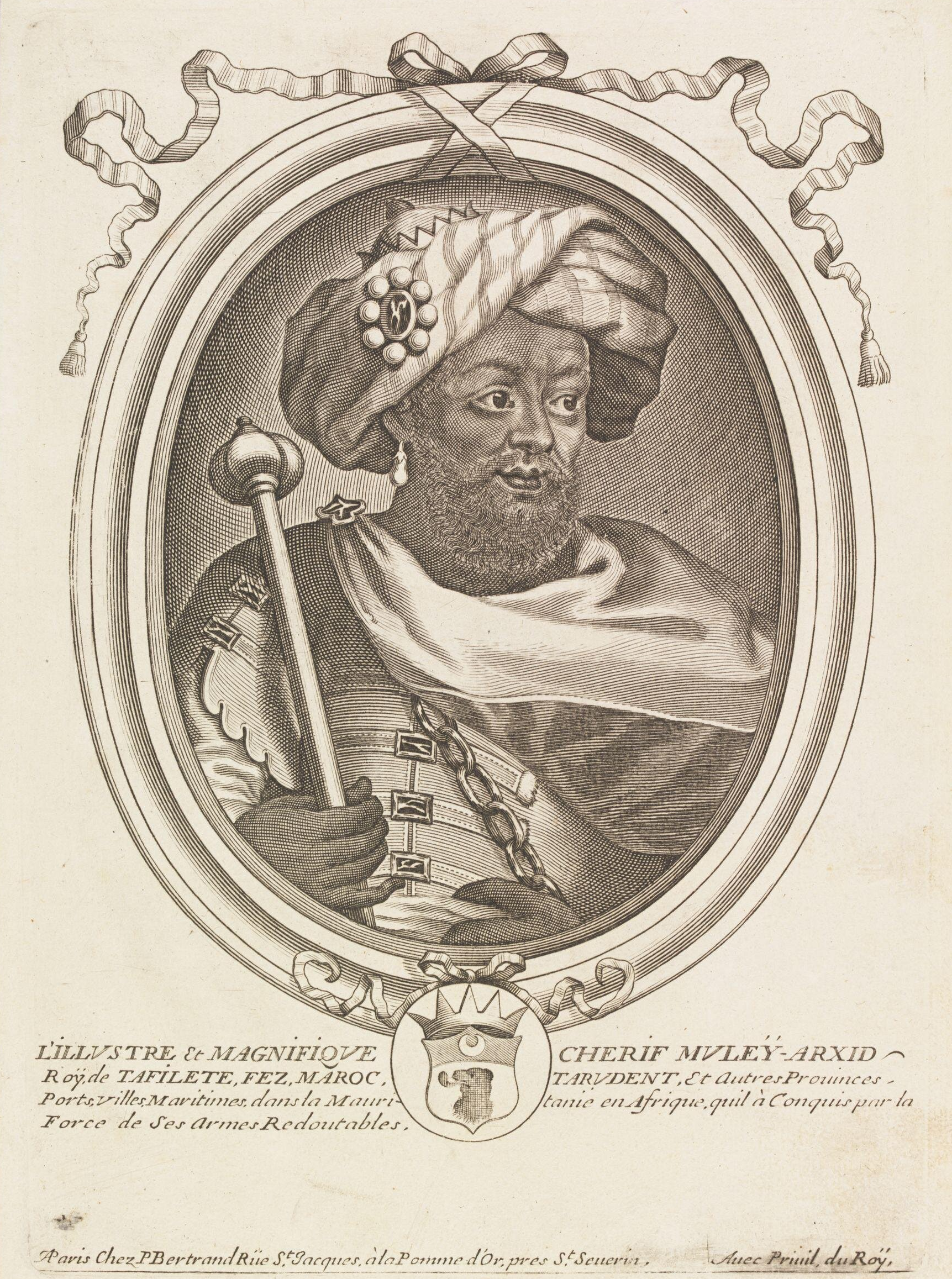
Moulay Rashid, the first sultan of the Alaouite dynasty in 1667

After the death of the Saadi sultan Ahmad al-Mansur, Morocco entered a period of unrest, during which his sons fought with one another for the throne, while the country was parcelled up by the different military leaders and religious authorities. From the beginning of the reign of Zidan Abu Maali in 1613, the Saadi sultanate was very weak. The Zawiya Dila'iya (or Zawiya of Dila) controlled central Morocco, the Zaouia of Illigh established its influence from Souss to the Draa River, the marabout Sidi al-Ayachi took possession of the northwestern plains, the Atlantic coast as far as Taza, the Republic of Salé became an independent state at the mouth of the Bou Regreg, and the city of Tétouan became a city-state under the control of the Naqsis family. At Tafilalt, the Alaouites were appointed by the local people in order to check the influence of the Zaouias of Illigh and Dila. They were an independent emirate from 1631.

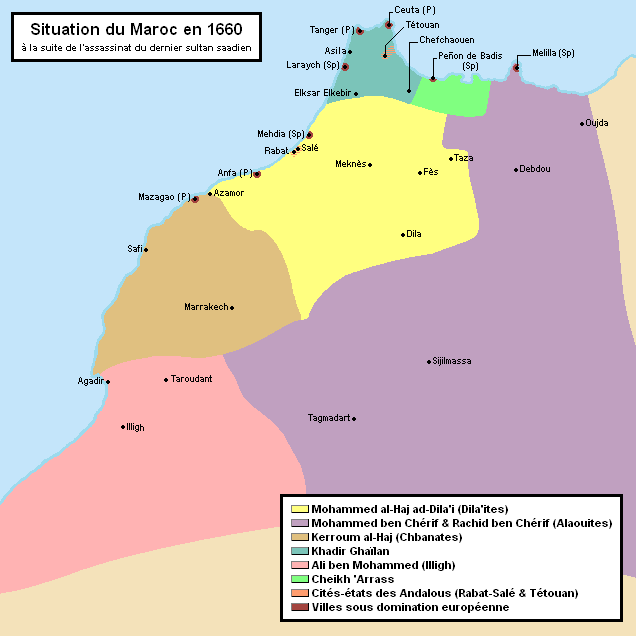
Political situation in Morocco in 1660, after the assassination of the final Saadi sultan Ahmad al-Abbas

Three rulers preceded Ismail ben Sharif: his father, Moulay Sharif, then his two half-brothers respectively Sidi Mohammed and Moulay Rachid. As the first sovereign of the 'Alawi dynasty from 1631, Moulay Sharif succeeded in keeping Tafilalt outside the authority of the Dila'iya. He abdicated in 1636 and his eldest son, Sidi Muhammad ibn Sharif succeeded him. Under the latter's reign, the 'Alawi realm expanded into the north of the country, to Tafna and the Draa river and managed to capture the city of Oujda. His half-brother, Moulay Rashid rebelled against him and managed to kill him on 3 August 1664, in a battle on the plain of Angad (near Oujda). Moulay Ismail chose to support Rashid and was rewarded by being appointed governor of Meknes. There, Moulay Ismail devoted himself to the region's agriculture and commerce, to increase his wealth, (Note: Audiffret 1821, p. 376) while Moulay Rashid reigned as Sultan of Tafilalt and then as Sultan of Morocco after his conquest of Fez on 27 May 1664. Rashid further entrusted Ismail with military control of the North of Morocco and made him Khalifa (viceroy) of Fez in 1667, while he fought in the south of Morocco. Rashid conquered the Dila'iya in 1668 and then took two years to overcome rebels at Marrakesh before he broke into the city in 1669.

On 6 April 1670, in the presence of his brother Sultan Moulay Rashid, Moulay Ismail celebrated his first marriage at Fez to the daughter of a Sa'adi prince. On 25 July, he put to death sixty brigands from Oulad Djama, by crucifying them on the wall of the Borj el-Jadid in Fez. While Rashid continued his campaigns against the independent tribes of the High Atlas, he was killed on 9 April 1672 at Marrakesh, after falling off his horse. On 13 April, after he had learned of Rashid's death, Moulay Ismail rushed to Fez, where he took possession of his brother's treasury and then proclaimed himself Sultan of Morocco on 14 April 1672, at the age of twenty-six. (Note: Abitbol 2009, p. 233.) This proclamation occurred around 2 pm and a grand ceremony followed. The whole population of Fez, including the nobles, intellectuals, and sharifs swore to be loyal to the new sovereign, as did the tribes and cities of the kingdom of Fez, who sent embassies and presents to him. Only Marrakesh and the region around it did not send an embassy. Ismail fixed his capital at Meknes, on account of the water supply and climate of the town.

=== Difficult early reign ===
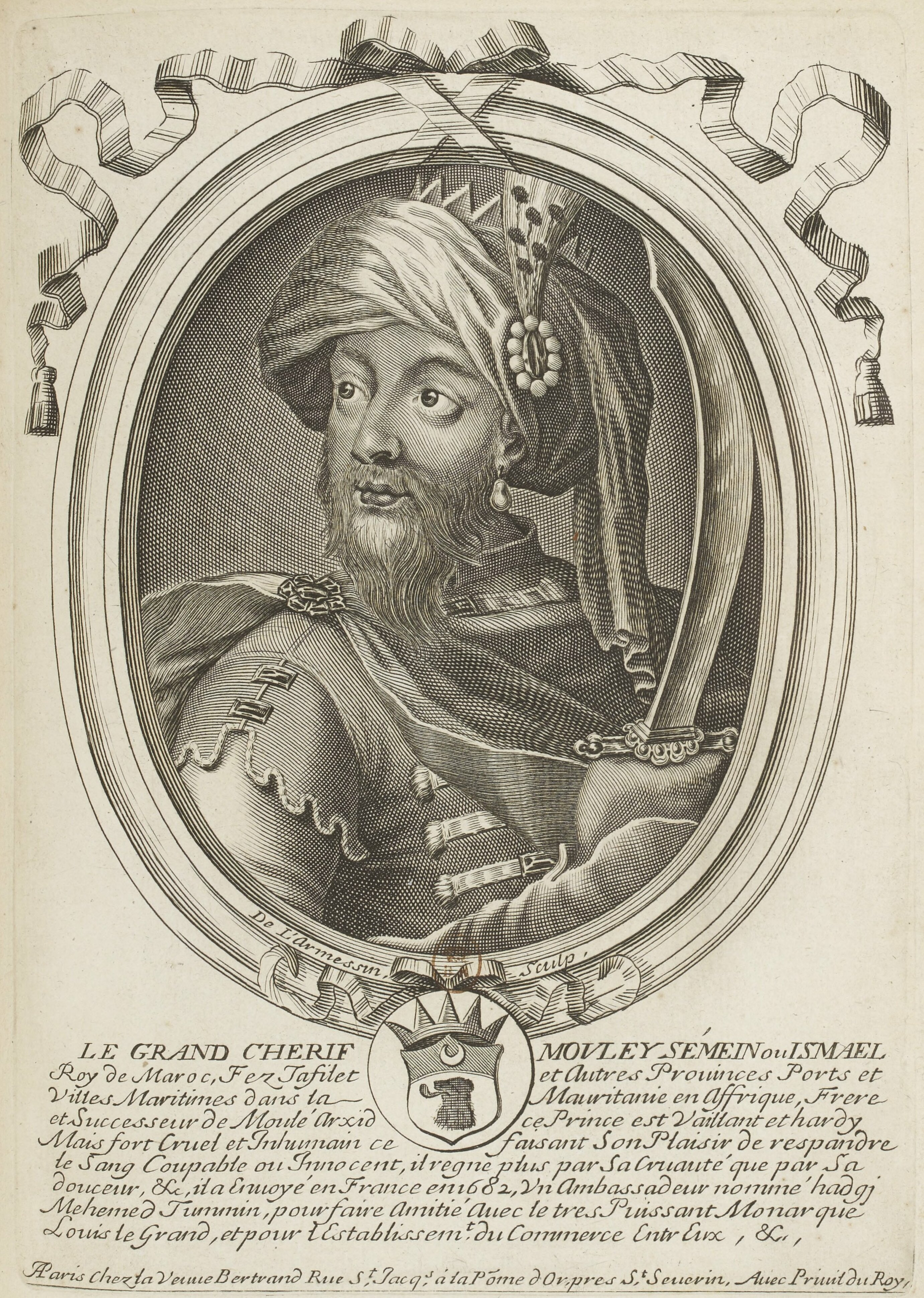
The Grand Cherif Mouley Sémein ou Ismael, by Nicolas I de Larmessin

After seizing power, Moulay Ismail faced several rebellions: most significant was the revolt of his nephew Moulay Ahmed ben Mehrez, son of Moulay Murad Mehrez, then the rebellions of his brothers, including Harran ibn Sharif, who assumed the title of King of Tafilalt. The Tetouan warlord Khadir Ghaïlan also resisted Sultan Ismail, along with several tribes and religious groups. (Note: Ogot 1998, p. 174.)

When the news of Rashid's death reached Sijilmassa, Ahmed ben Mehrez rushed to Marrakesh, to have himself proclaimed sultan. The tribes of Al Haouz, the Arabs of Souss, and the inhabitants of Marrakesh joined him and he was able to assume control of the area. He rallied the southern tribes and was proclaimed sultan at Marrakesh. In response, Moulay Ismail launched a campaign against his nephew on 27 April 1672. Ismail was victorious as a result of his artillery. He entered the city of Marrakesh and was recognized as sultan there on 4 June 1672. Ahmed suffered a bullet wound and fled into the mountains. Ismail pardoned the inhabitants of Marrakesh and reorganized the city's defenses. He then went back to Fez to collect his brother Rashid's coffin and inter it in the mausoleum of Sheikh Ali ibn Herzouhm, before returning to Meknes on 25 July 1672.

Moulay Ismail arranged the organisation of the empire and distributed goods to the soldiers of his army in preparation for an expedition into the Sahara. The project was abandoned however after a revolt broke out in the city of Fez, during which the Caid Zidan ben Abid Elamri, the intended head of the expedition, was killed and the sultan's forces were expelled from the city, on the night of 26 August 1672. Moulay Ismail immediately arrived and was encamped outside the walls of the city. After several days of conflict, the noble clans of Fez appealed to Ahmed ben Mehrez in despair. He responded favorably to their appeal and traveled through Debdou to Taza, where he was proclaimed Sultan again. In the meanwhile, Khadir Ghaïlan sent a messenger to Fez and notified the inhabitants of his arrival by sea from Algiers to Tetouan, where he was welcomed by the Ennaqsîs family that governed the city. These events sparked serious unrest in the country. Moulay Ismail marched on Taza, which surrendered to him after a siege of several months, and forced Ahmed ben Mehrez to flee into the Sahara. While the siege of Fez continued, Ismail turned northwest to face Khadir Ghaïlan, who had taken control of the Habt region (the Gharb and Khlout plains and part of the Jebala territory) with the help of the Ottoman Regency of Algiers. With a force of 12,000 men, Ismail suppressed the rebellion and pacified the northern provinces, killing Ghaïlan on 2 September 1673 at Ksar el-Kebir He returned again to Fez, which was still under siege by his forces. The heart of the city, Fez Jdid, finally opened its gates on 28 October 1673, after a siege of fourteen months and eight days. Ismail granted a pardon to the inhabitants of Fez. He reorganised the city and appointed governors in charge of the suburbs of Fez el Bali and Fez Jdid.

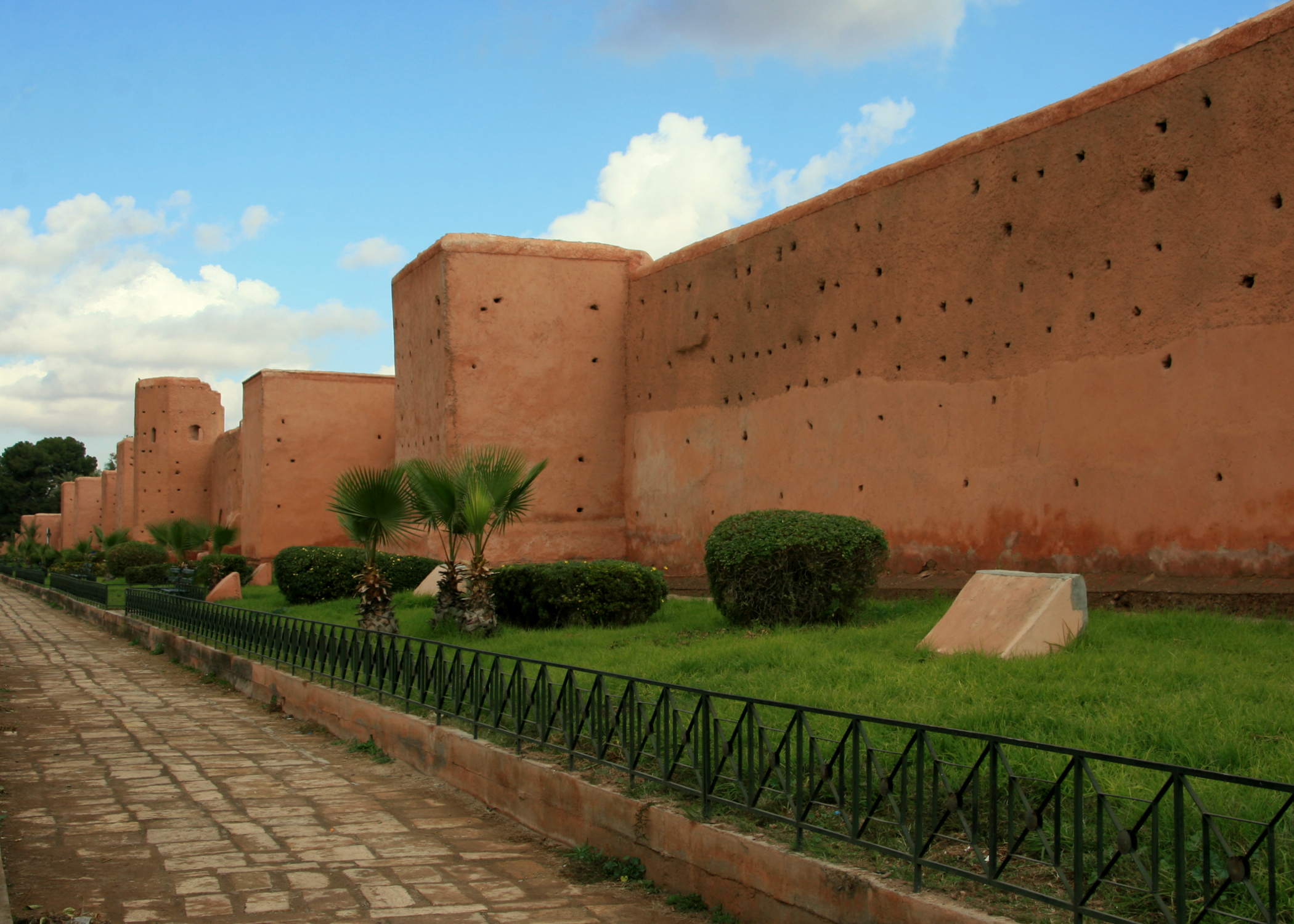
Marrakesh, one of the imperial capitals of Morocco, revolted against Moulay Ismail, in favor of Ahmed ben Mehrez, three times. The city was harshly punished.

On returning to Meknes, Moulay Ismail continued construction work and built several palaces. (Note: Hamet 1923, p. 339.) He was disturbed once more by his nephew Ahmed ben Mehrez, who seized Marrakesh sometime after May 1673. When Ismail learned of it in 1674, he first launched a campaign against the Arab tribes of the Angad region who were engaging in banditry. He severely defeated the Sgoûna tribe and then put in place the preparations for a major campaign against his nephew. Ismail marched at the head of his army into the Tadla region and encountered Ahmed ben Mehrez's army at Bou Agba, near Oued El Abid. Ismail was victorious over his nephew's army and killed its commander, Hida Ettouïri. Ahmed was chased by his uncle all the way to Marrakesh, where he entrenched himself. Ismail besieged the city and took it by force in 1674, forcing Ahmed to flee to the province of Drâa. The sultan then led a number of operations against the Chaouia tribes. In this same year, the Sanhaja of the High and Middle Atlas revolted and massacred the envoys of the Sultan, after having refused to pay tribute. Moulay Ismail launched the first expedition and attempted to dislodge them from the mountain strongholds where they had entrenched themselves. The sultan's troops were repulsed by a force of 8,000 Berber infantry and 5,000 Berber cavalries. A second expedition followed, and this time the Sultan's forces inflicted a heavy defeat on the rebels, seizing substantial booty.

In 1675, with the help of the inhabitants of Taroudant, Ahmed secretly returned to Marrakesh, expelled the royal army, and reoccupied the city. (Note: Audiffret 1821, p. 377.) Ismail placed Marrakesh under siege once more. The fighting was bloody, with very high casualties on both sides, especially in June 1676. Ahmed eventually had to flee the city on 26 June 1677, heading for Souss. This time, Ismail violently sacked the city as punishment for supporting Ahmed.

While still at Marrakesh, Ismail learned that Ahmed ben Abdellah ad-Dila'i, grandson of Mohammed al-Hajj ibn Abu Bakr al-Dila'i, had gathered a large army of Sanhaja tribes from the mountains, crossed the Moulouya River and was raiding the Arab tribes of Tadla and Saïss, forcing them to flee to the cities of Fez, Meknes, and Sale. Ahmed was attempting to revive the defunct Zawiya Dila'iya and was supported by the Ottomans in Algiers, who had previously given him refuge. Since Ismail was busy with Ahmed ben Mehrez at Souss, he sent an autonomous force of 3,000 cavalries. They were defeated by the Berber army of Ahmed ben Abdellah and the force's commander, Caid Ikhlef, was killed. Ismail then sent two further armies, numbering 4,000 men each, which were also beaten – the first near Meknes and the second at Kasba Tadla, which was then seized and destroyed by the Sanhaja. Meanwhile, Ismail also learned that three of his brothers, Moulay Harran, Moulay Hammada, and Moulay Murad Mehrez (the father of Ahmed ben Mehrez) had revolted and attacked Tafilalt. The sultan decided to deal with the unrest at Tadla first. He personally intervened and routed the Berbers in a battle in which say 3,000 Berbers dead and several hundred soldiers of the imperial army. He retook Tadla, stabilised the Middle Atlas region with his artillery and an enveloping maneuver carried out by the guich of Oudaya. The heads of nearly 700 rebels were nailed to the walls of Fez by the Caid Abdellah Errousi. Moulay Ismail returned to Meknes at the end of 1677 and ended his brothers' rebellion. He captured Moulay Harran but chose to spare him.

=== Stabilisation of the empire ===
Between 1678 and 1679, Moulay Ismail attempted an expedition over the Amour mountain range into the region of Cherg, accompanied by a large contingent of Arab tribes, including the Beni Amer. The Turkish artillery put all the Arab tribes in the expedition to flight and the Sultan was forced to set the border between the Regency of Algiers and Morocco at Tafna. Moulay Ismail restored and reorganised Oujda on his return. He reorganised the south of the empire following an expedition in 1678, from Souss and the oasis of Touat to the provinces of Chinguetti on the border of the Sudan region in modern Mauritania. During his journey, Ismail appointed caids and pashas and ordered the construction of forts and ribats to demonstrate his control to the makhzen in these regions. During this expedition, the Sultan received embassies from all the Banu Maqil (Maqil tribes) in the Saharan provinces of the country, which stretched all the way to the Senegal River. Moroccan control over the Pashalik of Timbuktu was established in 1670 and continued throughout Moulay Ismail's reign.

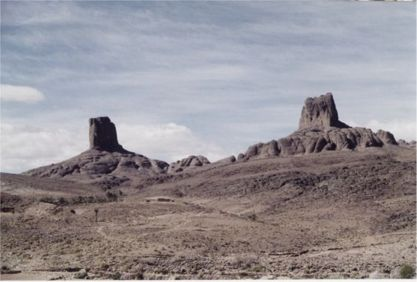
Jbel Saghro, summit of the eastern part of the Anti-Atlas in Aït Atta

Around the end of Ramadan 1678–1679, Ismail's three brothers, Harran, Hashem, and Ahmed, and three of his cousins revolted with the help of the Sanhaja confederation of Aït Atta and the tribes of the Toudra and Dadès valleys. Moulay Ismail launched a massive expedition and seized Ferkla, Gueria, Toudra, and Dadès in quick succession. The rebel tribes abandoned their oases and fled into the Jbel Saghro in the eastern Anti-Atlas. With a large army, Ismail fought a difficult battle in the Jbel Saghro on 3 February 1679. The heavy casualties included Moussa ben Ahmed ben Youssef, commander of the Moroccan army, and 400 soldiers from Fez. It was a partial failure. The battle was ended by an agreement in which the rebel tribes granted the people of Tafilalt free passage back to Marrakesh through the Saharan rebel tribes' territory and promised future aid against the Christians. On their return journey, a blizzard struck the force as it crossed the Atlas at Telwet or Elglâoui on the Jbel Ben Deren, destroying nearly three thousand tents, part of the army, and the booty. In a fury, Moulay Ismail executed his vizier to avenge those who had been traveling with him, even though the vizier had had nothing to do with this catastrophe.

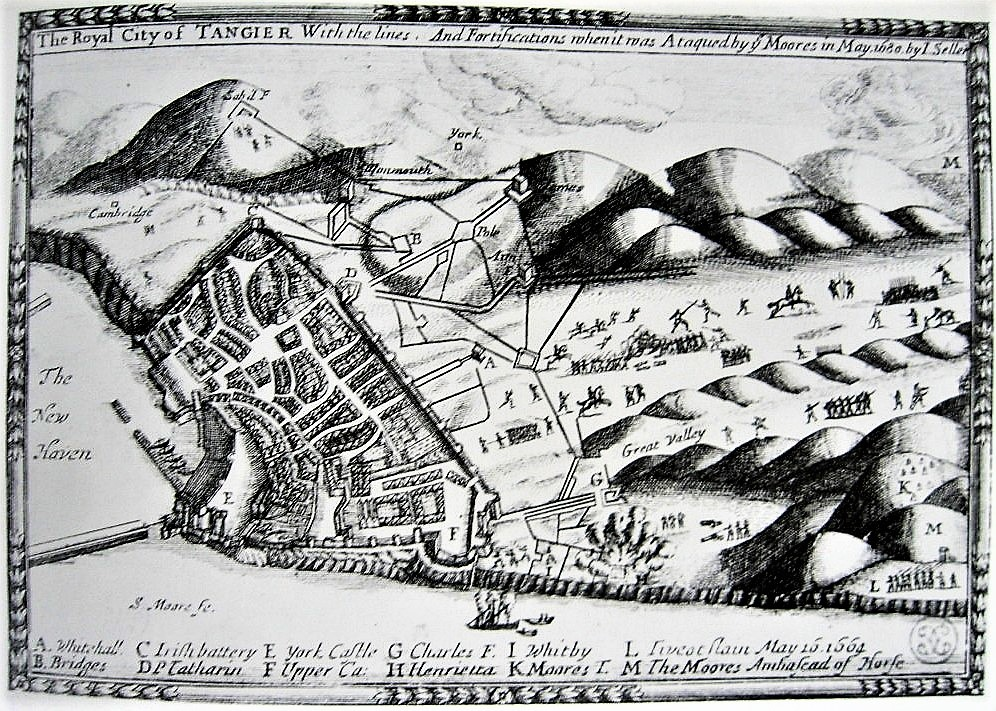
Engraving from 1680 depicted the English fort at Tangiers

A plague struck around this time that killed several thousand people, mainly in the plain of Rharb and Rif.

After he had achieved the unification of Morocco, Moulay Ismail decided to end the Christian presence in the country. He first launched a campaign to recapture the city of Tangiers, which had been under European control since 1471 – initially Portuguese, the city had passed into English hands after the marriage of Catherine of Braganza to Charles II. The city was strongly fortified and had a large garrison of 4,000 men. Moulay Ismail assigned one of his best generals, Ali ben Abdallah Er-Riffi, to besiege Tangier in 1680. (Note: Ogot 1998, p. 175.) At Tangiers, the English resisted, but, as a result of the high cost of maintaining the garrison, they decided to abandon the city, demolishing their fortifications and harbor over the winter of 1683. The Moroccan army entered the city on 5 February 1684.

In 1681, while the siege of Tangiers was still ongoing, Moulay Ismail sent part of his army under the command of Omar ben Haddou El-Bottoui to conquer the city of La Mamora. This city had been occupied by the Spanish in the period of chaos in Morocco after 1614. Ismail besieged the city, which had no water source, and captured it, along with all the Spaniards in the city, who numbered 309. Caid Omar had told the Spaniards that they would not be sold into slavery if they surrendered unconditionally "Although they would be captives they would spend their days without working, until the first redemption." However Moulay Ismaïl saw no reason to honor Kaid Omar's promises and had no intention of allowing the captives from al-Mamurah to be redeemed so they, including fifty "poor girls and women", were forced to walk to Meknes as booty along with their possessions, arms and artillery (88 bronze cannons, 15 iron cannons, fire-pots, muskets, and gunpowder) which Germain Mousette wrote was "more than he had in the rest of his kingdom". The city was renamed al-Mahdiya. Omar ben Haddou died of the plague on his return journey and was replaced by his brother Ahmed ben Haddou.

While his generals were undertaking these operations, Moulay Ismail was focused on stabilising the country. After an expedition to the Cherg region against the Beni Amer, he learned that Ahmed ben Mehrez had made yet another agreement with the Turks in Algiers. He also learned that the Turkish army was approaching Tafna and had already reached the territory of the Beni Snassen. Ismail immediately sent a large force to the south of the country to face Ahmed and prepared an expedition against the Ottomans, which did not end up taking place because the Turkish army withdrew. He then marched south to confront his nephew at Souss in 1683. A battle took place there in April. After twenty-five days of fighting, Ahmed fled to Taroudant and entrenched himself there. Another battle on 11 June 1683 cost more than 2,000 lives. Ahmed and Ismail were themselves wounded. The clashes continued until Ramadan. Moulay Ismail undertook two expeditions that succeeded in pacifying several Berber regions.

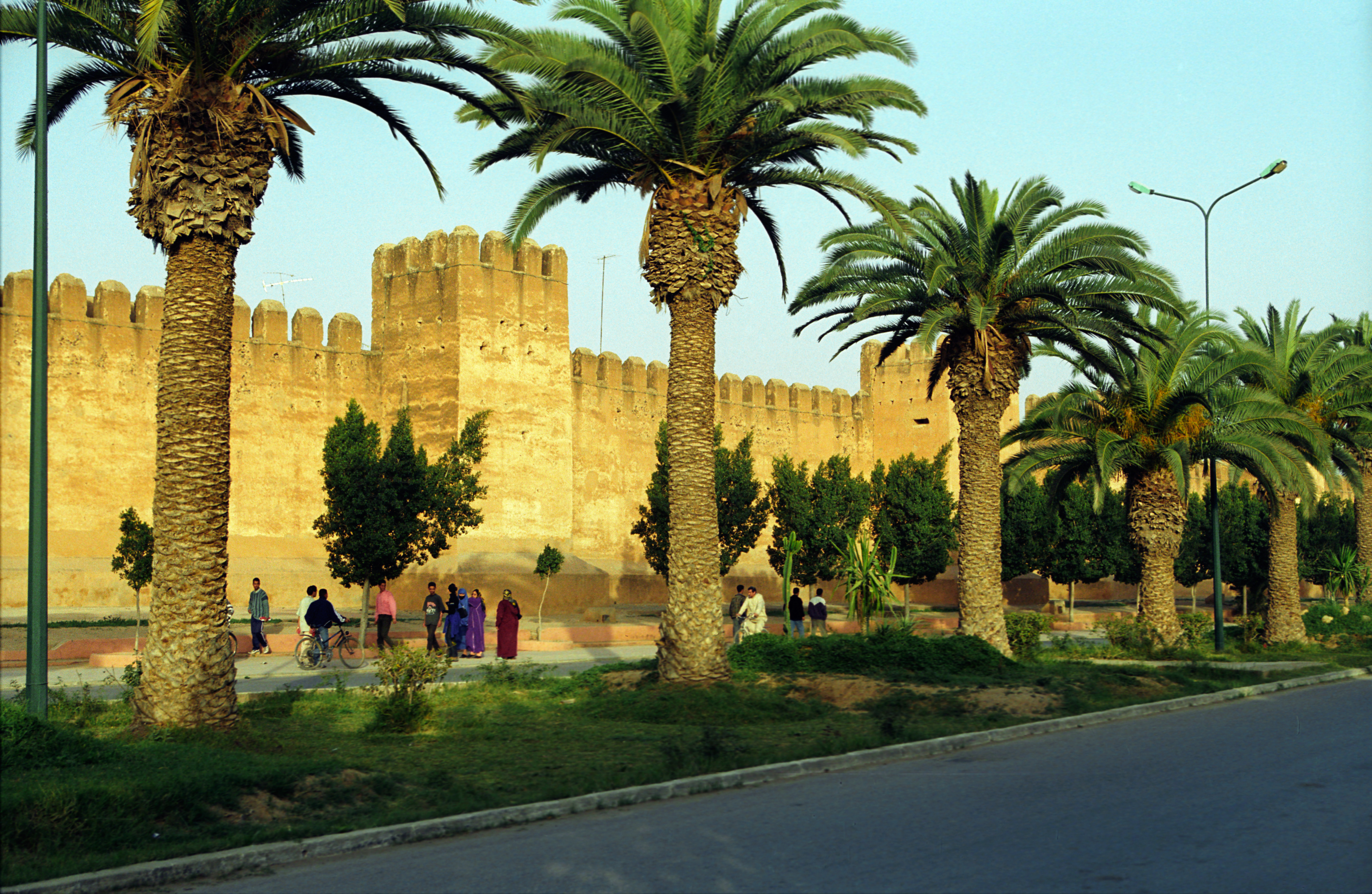
Taroudant, city which sustained the rebellion of Ahmed Ben Mehrez and Moulay Harran

While Moulay Ismail was occupied with these tribes in the Atlas, Ahmed ben Mehrez forged an alliance with Moulay Harran to destabilise Ismail's empire. When Moulay Ismail learned, in 1684/5, that the two rebels had taken control of Taroudant and its hinterland, he immediately set out to besiege the city. Ahmed went out with a group of slaves to visit a sanctuary and was confronted by some members of the Zirâra tribe, who were soldiers of Ismail. Although they did not recognise him, the Zirâra attacked him, sparking a short battle, which ended with the death of Ahmed. The sultan's soldiers only realised who he was after his death around the middle of October 1685. Ismail ordered that he be given a funeral and buried. Moulay Harran continued the resistance until April 1687, when he fled into the Sahara. The population of Taroudant was massacred and the city was repopulated with Rifans from Fez. (Note: Hamet 1923, p. 348.) Many of Ismail's military commanders had lost their lives in this war, but after this date, no one else challenged the power of the Sultan. The war between Ahmed and Ismail had come to an end after thirteen years of fighting.

Moulay Ismail now prepared a strong army, estimated at 30,000–50,000 men, (Note: Castries 1927, p. 269.) under the command of Ali ben Abdallah Er-Riffi (Note: Figueras et Joulia Saint-Cyr, p. 195.) and Ahmed ben Haddou El-Bottoui, to seize the city of Larache, which had been under Spanish control since 1610. (Note: Ogot 1998, p. 176.) The Sultan, who announced his plan in 1688, forced the Spaniards to fortify the city heavily, with 200 cannons and 1500–2000 men. The campaign began on 15 July 1689 and the siege began in August. The Moroccan army eventually took the city on 11 November 1689, at an estimated cost of 10,000 dead. The Moroccans captured 1,600 Spanish soldiers including 100 officers and 44 cannons. The Spanish army lost 400 soldiers in the battle. (Note: Castries 1927, pp. 280–281.) A prisoner exchange was arranged at a rate of one officer for ten Moroccans, one hundred officers were exchanged for a thousand Moroccan prisoners. The rest of the Spanish garrison remained in captivity, as slaves in Meknes, except for those who converted to Islam. (Note: Castries 1927, p. 376.) To celebrate the triumph Moulay Ismaïl issued an edict banning the wearing of black shoes because the Spanish were said to have introduced the custom into Morocco when they first acquired Larache in 1610. The mufti of Fez was so elated by the victory he wrote,

How many infidels at dusk have had their heads severed from their bodies! How many were dragged away with the death rattle in their throats?! For how many throats have our Lance's been as necklaces? How many lance tips were thrust into their breasts!

Shortly after Larache was conquered, Ismail sent Ahmed ben Haddou to besiege Assilah. Exhausted, the Spanish garrison evacuated the city by the sea and the Moroccan army occupied the town in 1691.

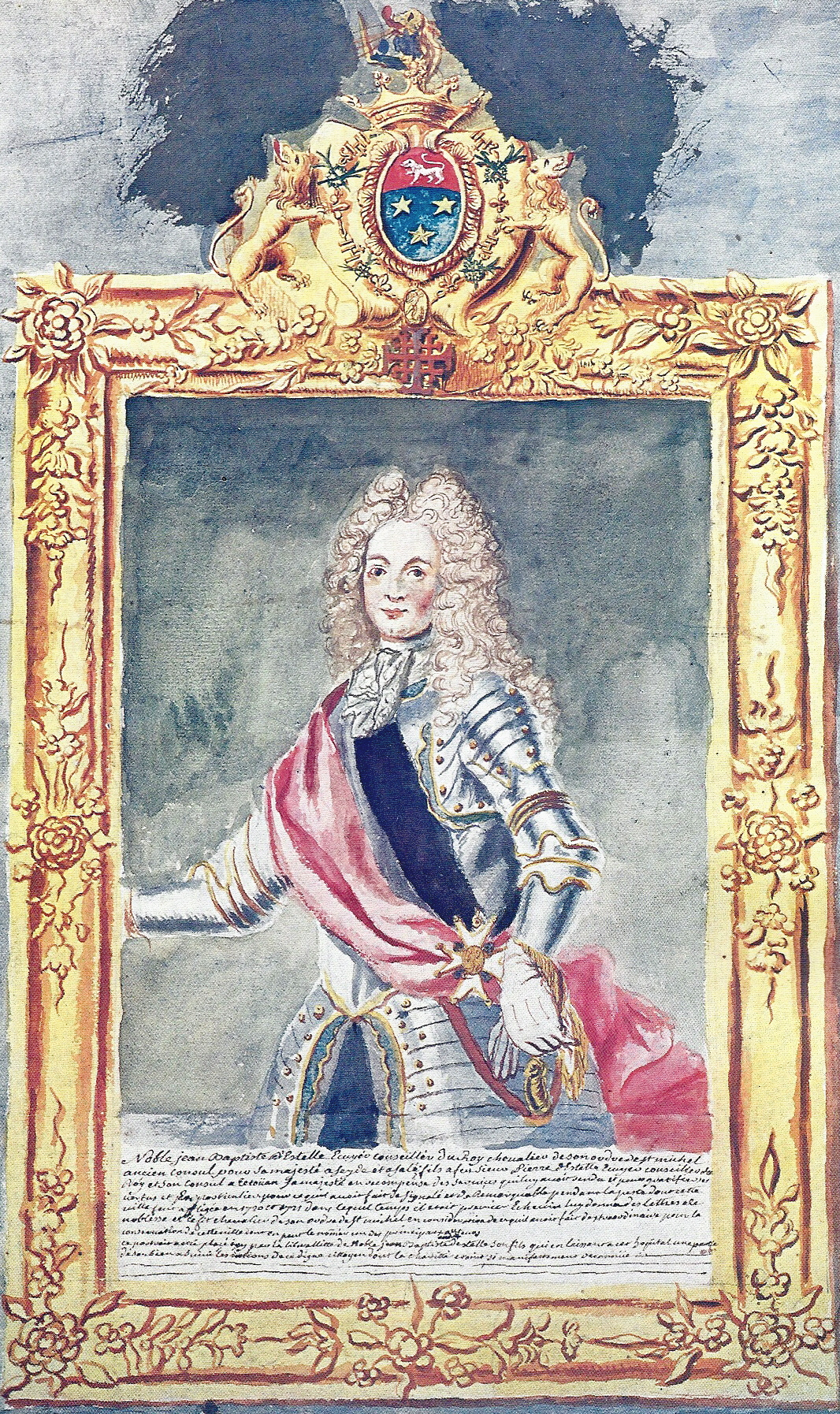
Portrait of Jean-Baptiste Estelle, French consul in Salé, who negotiated the release of French prisoners captured by the corsairs, with Moulay Ismail

In 1692–3, Moulay Ismail organised a very large expedition against the last unconquered tribes. These were the Sanhaja Brâbér tribes, Berbers in Fêzzâz, a region in the western part of the Middle Atlas. These tribes formed the last pocket of the Bled es-Siba (the area that did not accept the authority of the sultan). (Note: al-Nasiri 1906, p. 107.) Ismail's army was very numerous and equipped with mortars, ballistae, cannons, and other siege weapons, which were dragged by Christian slaves all the way from Moulouya to Ksar Beni M'Tir. Meanwhile, the Moroccan forces gathered at Adekhsan. Ismail divided his army into three groups. The first was commanded by Pasha Msahel, with 25,000 infantry, and marched from Tadla to Oued El Abid, bypassing the Aït Isri. The second army was led by Caid Ali Ou Barka and consisted of Aït Imour and Aït Idrassen, who had to occupy Tinteghalin. The third and final group was commanded by Ali ben Ichchou El-Qebli, caid of Ait Zemmour and Beni Hakim, and was concentrated in the High Moulouya. The unconquered tribes comprised the Aït Oumalou, the Ait Yafelman and the Aït Isri. They were surrounded by Mulay Ismail who used all his artillery to break up the Berber rebels. A terrible battle followed, the Berbers were dispersed and fled into the ravines and valleys. After pursuing them for three days, 12,000 Berbers had been captured by the Sultan, and 10,000 horses and 30,000 guns as booty. (Note: Hamet 1923, p. 350.) Moulay Ismail had now conquered the whole of Morocco and forced all the tribes of the country to recognise his authority. He was the first 'Alawi sultan to achieve this. He quickly organised the defense of the captured regions through the construction of several dozen fortresses throughout the country, which helped the central power to reach distant regions like Fêzzâz. With this victory, the conquest of Morocco was over. In 1693, according to Ahmad ibn Khalid al-Nasiri:

The sultan had not left a single tribe of the Moroccan Maghreb with either horses or weapons. Only the Black Guard, the Oudaias, the Ait Imour (a guich tribe), and the Rifans, while the Fezzans began a holy war against Ceuta (Note: al-Nasiri 1906, p. 109.)

The Guerouans learned this the hard way. Some men of this tribe who carried out raids in the upper course of the Ziz River, on the road to Sijilmassa, drew the attention of Moulay Ismail. He ordered the caid Idrassen Ali ben Ichchou El-Qebli to massacre them. In Ahmad ibn Khalid al-Nasiri's Al-Istiqsa, it is reported that Moulay Ismail provided 10,000 horsemen to Ali ben Ichchou, the caid of the Zemmour and Bni Hakem tribes and told him "I do not want you to return until you have fallen upon the Gerrouans and unless you bring back to me a heads for each man here." So they left to kill as many of the Guerouans as possible and to pillage their encampments. He offered 10 mithqals to anyone who brought back an additional head. In the end, they collected 12,000. The Sultan was very happy with this and extended Ali ben Ichchou's command to include the Aït Oumalou and Aït Yafelmâl territories, which had just been conquered. (Note: al-Nasiri 1906, p. 119.)

Jean-Baptiste Estelle, the French consul in Salé wrote to his minister, the Marquis de Torcy in 1698:

... that the vast extent of the Sharifan Empire is a single unit from the Mediterranean to the Senegal river. The people who live there, from the north to the south, are Moors who pay the Gharama to the Sultan.

At its height, the Moroccan army contained 100,000 (Note: Audiffret 1821, p. 378.) to 150,000 black soldiers in the Black Guard, as well as thousands more in the Guich of the Udaya, European renegades and vassal tribes which received land and slaves in exchange for providing soldiers.

=== Later reign and death ===
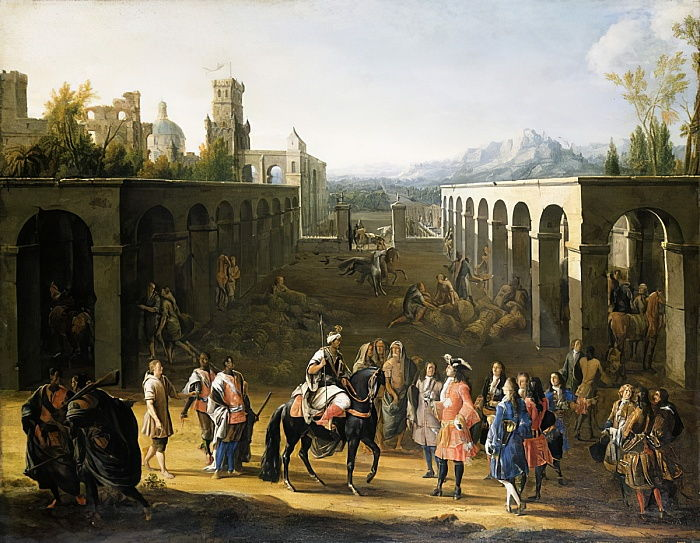
Ismail ibn Sharif receiving ambassador François Pidou de Saint Olon from Louis XIV, by Pierre-Denis Martin (1693)

The rest of Moulay Ismail's reign was marked by military setbacks and family problems relating to the succession. In May 1692, Moulay Ismail sent his son Moulay Zeydan with a large army to attack Ottoman Algeria. He was defeated by the Algerians who counter-attacked and advanced as far as Fez. Ismail offered his submission to the dey of Algiers and had to send an embassy to Algiers to make peace. He thus fixed his borders with the Beylik of Algiers at the Moulouya River. (Note: Hamet 1923, p. 349.) In 1693, Moulay Ismail raided the Oran region and attempted to pillage the Beni Amer which was successful. The city of Oran resisted two attacks, leading to the sultan's retreat. This time, it was the Turks who sent envoys to make peace, at the initiative of the Ottoman Sultan, Ahmed II. In 1699, Moulay Ismail participated in the Maghrebi War and was successful in capturing the Beylik of Mascara and advanced with about 50,000 men as far as the Chelif River but his army was routed by the Algerians at the Battle of Chelif in 1701. Ismail, wounded in the fighting, had to escape on horseback and narrowly escaped capture. Moulay Ismail fought other minor conflicts with the Ottoman Algeria such as Laghouat in 1708 which turned out successful.

The 'Alawi Empire in the late 17th century, during the reign of Moulay Ismail

Ismail attempted to besiege the city of Ceuta with an army of 40,000 soldiers, but the strength of Spanish resistance meant that the siege dragged on. Part of Ismail's army also besieged Melilla from 1694 to 1696, but the city's fortifications were too much for them. In spring 1701, Moulay Ismail launched another expedition against Algeria. The Moroccan forces advanced to the Chelif River before they were intercepted by the Algerian army in Chediouïa. With a force of 10,000–12,000 men, the Algerian army managed to defeat the 60,000 soldiers of the Moroccan army. The Moroccan army suffered a heavy defeat and fell into disarray. Moulay Ismail himself was wounded and barely escaped. The heads of 3,000 Moroccan soldiers and 50 Moroccan leaders were brought to Algiers. (Note: Hamet 1923, p. 351.) In 1702, Moulay Ismail gave his son Moulay Zeydan an army of 12,000 men and instructed him to capture the Peñón de Vélez de la Gomera. The Moroccans razed the Spanish fortress, but failed to retain la Isleta. Meanwhile, the English admiral, George Rooke joined in the siege of Ceuta, blockading the port in 1704.

Between 1699 and 1700, Moulay Ismail divided the provinces of Morocco between his children. Moulay Ahmed was given responsibility for the province of Tadla and a force of 3,000 Black Guards. Moulay Abdalmalik was entrusted with Draâ province, with a kasbah and 1,000 cavalry. Moulay Mohammed al-Alim received Souss and 3,000 cavalries. Moulay El-Mâmoun commanded Sijilmasa and received 500 cavalry. When he died, he was replaced two years later by Moulay Youssef. Moulay Zeydan received command of Cherg (East), but he lost it after the Ottomans attacked and Ismail made peace with them. (Note: al-Nasiri 1906, p. 122.) He was then replaced by Moulay Hafid. This division of the realm provoked jealousy and rivalry between Ismail's sons, which sometimes degenerated into open clashes. In one of these, Moulay Abdelmalek was defeated by his brother, Moulay Nasser, who took control of the whole of Draâ. (Note: al-Nasiri 1906, p. 123.) Moulay Sharif was appointed governor of Draâ by his father in place of Abdelmalek and succeeded in retaking the region from Nasser. (Note: al-Nasiri 1906, p. 124.)

In response to the intrigues, slanders, and opposition of Lalla Aisha Mubarka, who wanted her son Moulay Mohammed Zeydan to succeed his father as Sultan, Ismail's eldest son Moulay Mohammed al-Alim revolted in Souss and took control of Marrakesh on 9 March 1703. When Moulay Zeydan arrived with an army, Mohammed al-Alim fled to Taroudant. His brother besieged the place and captured it on 25 June 1704, and took him to Oued Beht on 7 July. Mohammed al-Alim was harshly punished by his father, who amputated one hand and one arm, executing both the butcher who refused to spill Mohammed al-Alim's blood on the grounds that he was a Sharif, and the one who agreed to do it. (Note: Audiffret 1821, p. 379.) He subsequently eliminated a caid of Marrakesh who had been responsible for Moulay Mohammed al-Alim's acquisition of the city, with exceptional violence. Moulay al-Alim committed suicide at Meknes on 18 July, despite precautions that his father had put in place to prevent this. (Note: al-Nasiri 1906, p. 125.) On learning of the atrocities which Moulay Zeydan had committed at Taroudant, especially the massacre of the city's inhabitants, Moulay Ismail organised for him to be murdered in 1708, having his wives smother him when he was black-out drunk. Moulay Nasser also revolted in Souss, but was eventually killed by the Oulad Delim, who remained loyal to Moulay Ismail. (Note: al-Nasiri 1906, p. 131.)

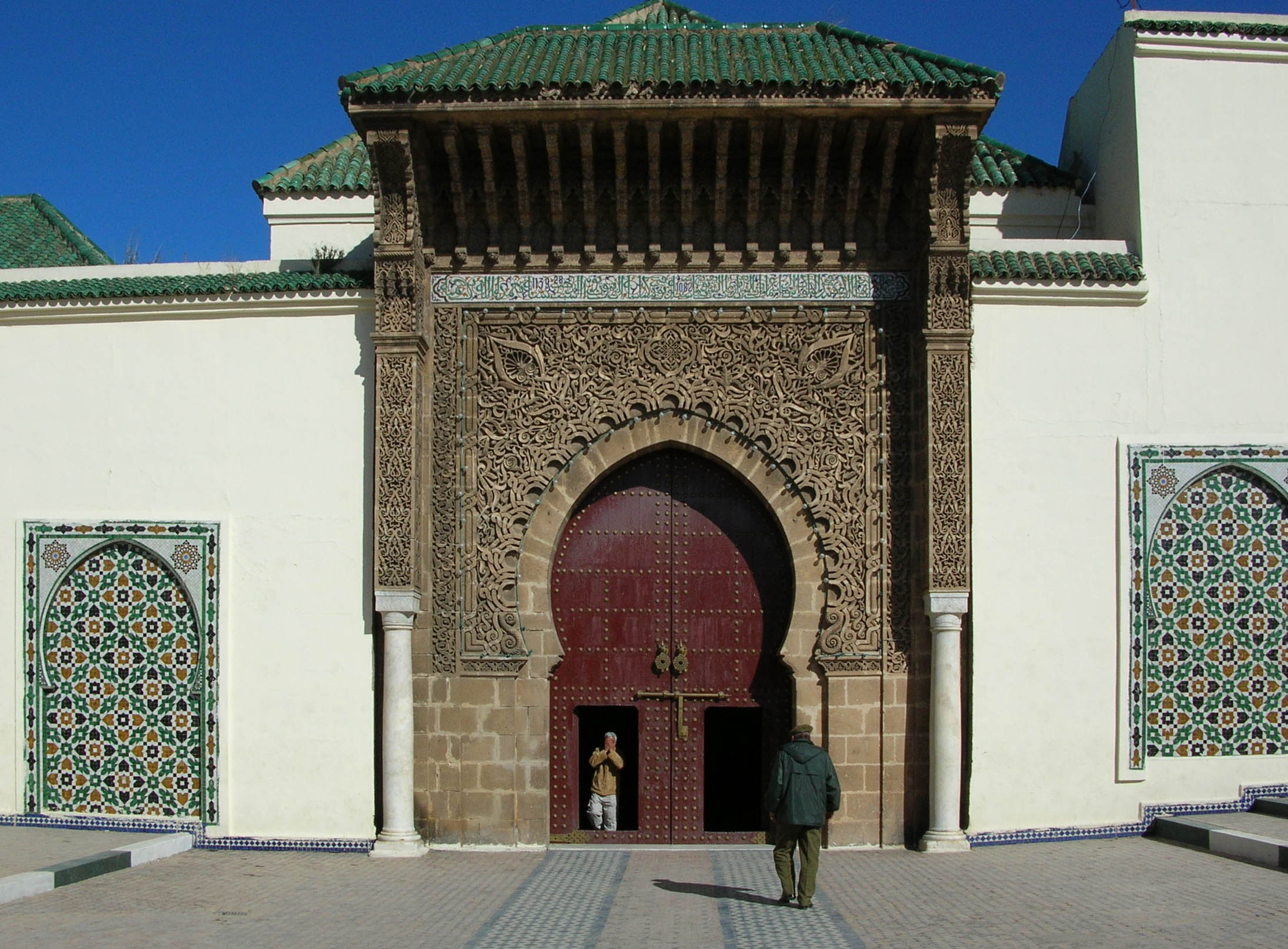
Mausoleum of Moulay Ismail in Meknès, Morocco

To prevent further trouble, Moulay Ismail rescinded the governorships that he had conferred on his sons, except for Moulay Ahmed, who retained his post as governor of Tadla and Moulay Abdelmalek who became governor of Souss. (Note: al-Nasiri 1906, p. 132.) Since Abdelmalek behaved like an independent and absolute monarch and refused to pay tribute, Ismail decided to change the order of succession – this was aided by the fact that Abdelmalek's mother was no longer close to him. Abdelmalek belatedly apologized, but Ismail remained hostile to his son. As a result, Moulay Ismail chose Moulay Ahmed as his successor.

In 1720, Philip V of Spain, who wanted to get revenge on Morocco for having aided the Grand Alliance in the War of the Spanish Succession, sent a fleet commanded by the Marquess of Lede to raise the siege of Ceuta which had been ongoing since 1694 and to force the Moroccans to give up on retaking the city. The Spanish fleet managed to raise the siege, but Moulay Ismail resumed it in 1721, after the Marquess of Lede had returned to Spain. The Sultan further planned a large armada for an invasion of Spain, but it was destroyed by a storm in 1722. The siege of Ceuta continued until Ismail's death in 1727.

Moulay Ismail ibn Sharif finally died on 22 March 1727 at the age of 81, from an abscess in his lower abdomen. His reign lasted 55 years, making him the longest-reigning Moroccan monarch. (Note: Hamet 1923, p. 354.) He was succeeded by Moulay Ahmed. Both he and Ahmed were buried in the same mausoleum in Meknes. The empire immediately fell into civil war, as a result of a rebellion of the Black Guards. More than seven claimants to the throne succeeded to power between 1727 and 1757, some of them repeatedly, like Moulay Abdallah who was Sultan six times.

== Character and policies ==
=== Appearance, personality, and contemporary assessments ===
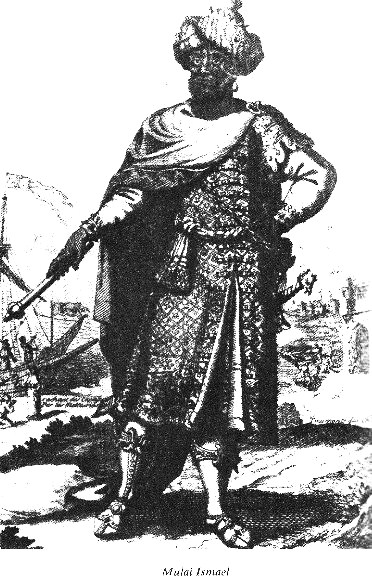
Engraving of Moulay Ismail

The main character traits of Moulay Ismail, according to the chronicles and legends of his period, were his "tendency to order and authority, as well as his iron will." He put his strength and power at the service of this unyielding will, "If God gave me the kingship, man cannot take it from me," he is reported to have said. This will was always apparent in his actions and decisions. According to Dominique Busnot, the colour of his clothes was linked to his mood,

Green is the sweetest colour; white is a good sign for those appealing to him; but when he is dressed in yellow, all the world trembles and flees his presence because it is the colour that he chooses on the days of his bloodiest executions.

— Dominique Busnot Histoire du regne de Mouley Ismael roy de Moroc, Fez, Tafilet, Soutz etc (1704) p.38.

According to contemporary Europeans, Moulay Ismail was considered cruel, greedy, merciless, and duplicitous. It was his cruelty and viciousness that particularly attracted their attention. Legends of the ease with which Ismail could behead or torture laborers or servants he thought to be lazy are numerous. According to a Christian slave, Moulay Ismail had more than 36,000 people killed over a 26-year period of his reign. According to François Pidou de Saint Olon, Moulay Ismail had 20,000 people assassinated over a twenty-year period of his reign. He was described by many authors, including Dominique Busnot, as a "bloodthirsty monster". However, researcher such as Richard Bordeaux Parker opined that frequently-told stories about the ten of thousands of Christian slaves' forced labours and the large dungeons where they were kept were exaggerated from the accounts of European ambassadors who visited Isma'il's court. Bordeaux Parker and Jonathan M. Bloom found the number of Christian slaves was likely closer to a few thousand at most and the chambers which suspected as slave prisons were actually storage rooms for grain and food supplies. The urban legends about Qara Prison holding thousands of them are disputed by Marianne Barrucand as she opined it is largely for food silos.

Moulay Ismail was also a very good horseman, with great physical strength, agility, and extraordinary cleverness, which he maintained even in his old age. "One of his normal entertainments was to draw his sword as he mounted his horse and decapitate the slave who held the stirrup."

His physical appearance is almost always described in the same way by the Europeans. He had "a long face, more black than white, i.e. very mulatto," according to Saint-Amans, ambassador of Louis XIV, who added that "he is the strongest and most vigorous man of his State." He was of average height and he inherited the colour of his face from his mother, who had been a black slave.

According to Germain Moüette, a French captive who lived in Morocco until 1682:

He is a vigorous man, well-built, quite tall but rather slender... his face is a clear brown colour, rather long, and its features are all quite well-formed. He has a long beard that is slightly forked. His expression, which seems quite soft, is not a sign of his humanity – on the contrary, he is very cruel... (Note: Moüette, p. 150.)

— Germain Moüette Relation de la captivité du Sr. Mouette dans les royaumes de Fez et de Maroc, p.150

=== Religion ===
"A faithful and pious follower of his religion", he attempted to convert King James II of England to Islam, sending him letters whose sincerity and religious feeling are inarguable. Dominique Busnot, who was generally critical of Ismail, asserted that "he had a great attachment to his Law and publicly practiced all the ceremonies, ablutions, prayers, fasts, and feasts with scrupulous precision."

He enjoyed debating theology with the Trinitarians in Morocco on points of controversy. On many occasions when returning from the mosque on Fridays, he asked for Trinitarians to be brought into his court. During a debate with the fathers of Mercy, he said this:

I have said enough for a man who uses reason; if you are stubborn, that is too bad. We are all children of Adam and therefore brothers; it is the only religion that creates a difference between us. It is, therefore, as a brother and in obedience to the commandments of my law that I charitably advise you that the true religion is that of Muhammad, which is the only one in which one can find salvation. I give you this advice for the sake of my conscience and to be justified in charging you on the day of judgment.

— Moulay Ismail

=== Construction ===
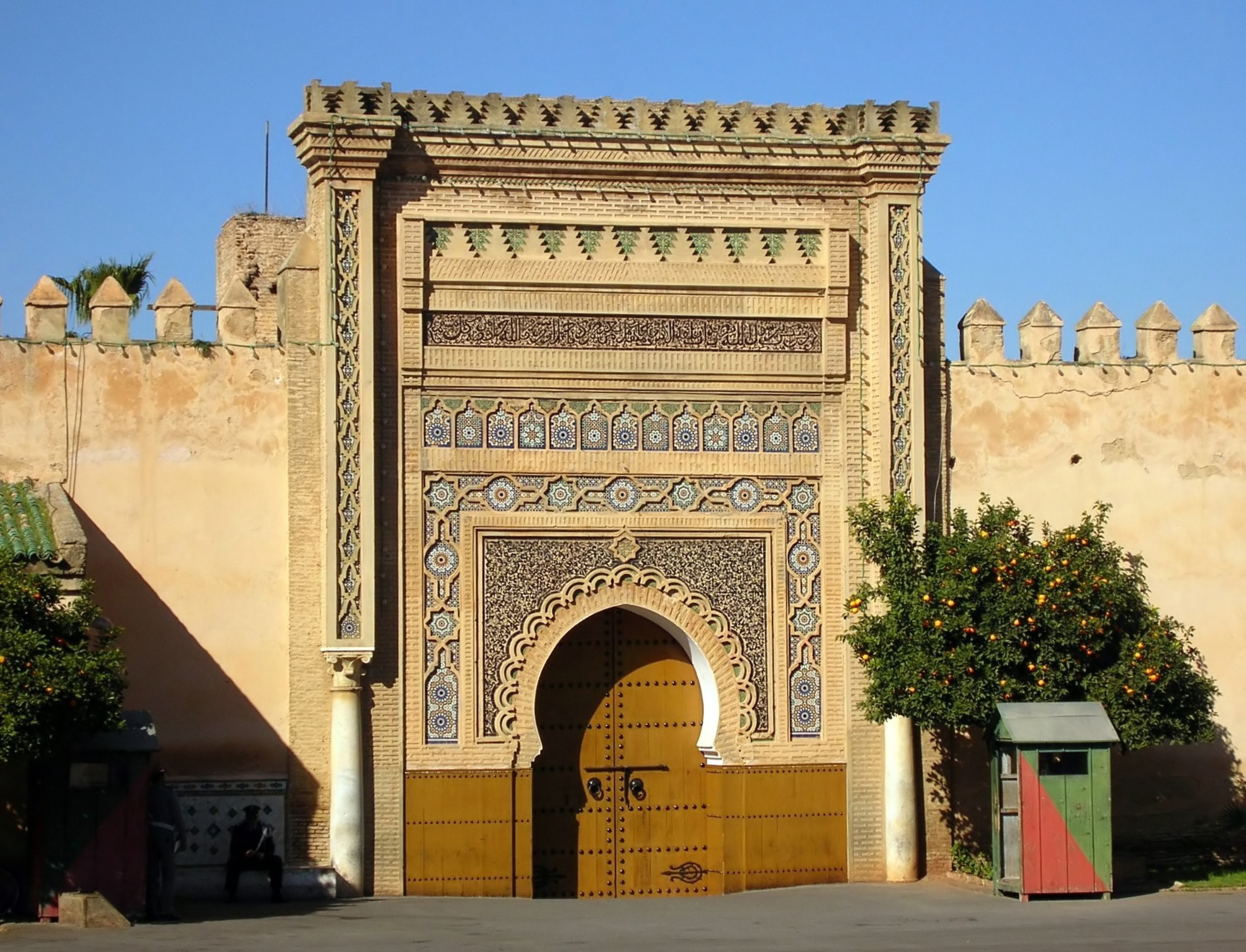
Dar al-Makhzen, the royal palace of Meknes, which was built during Moulay Ismail's reign as part of this larger Kasbah

Moulay Ismail chose Meknes as Morocco's capital city in 1672 and carried out an extensive building program there that resulted in the construction of numerous gates, mosques, gardens, and madrasas. On account of the rate of construction, Ismail is often compared to his contemporary Louis XIV. The Saadian El Badi Palace in Marrakesh was stripped of almost all its fittings, so that they could be transported to Meknes. Marble blocks and pillars were also taken from the ancient Roman ruins at Volubilis. At least 25,000 workers, mostly paid labourers along with a smaller number of Christian prisoners conscripted into forced labor, were employed on his major construction projects in Meknes. Ismail enjoyed visiting the building sites, to correct or revise whatever did not please him. He was sometimes cruel to the workers and did not hesitate to execute or punish those who produced poor-quality work.

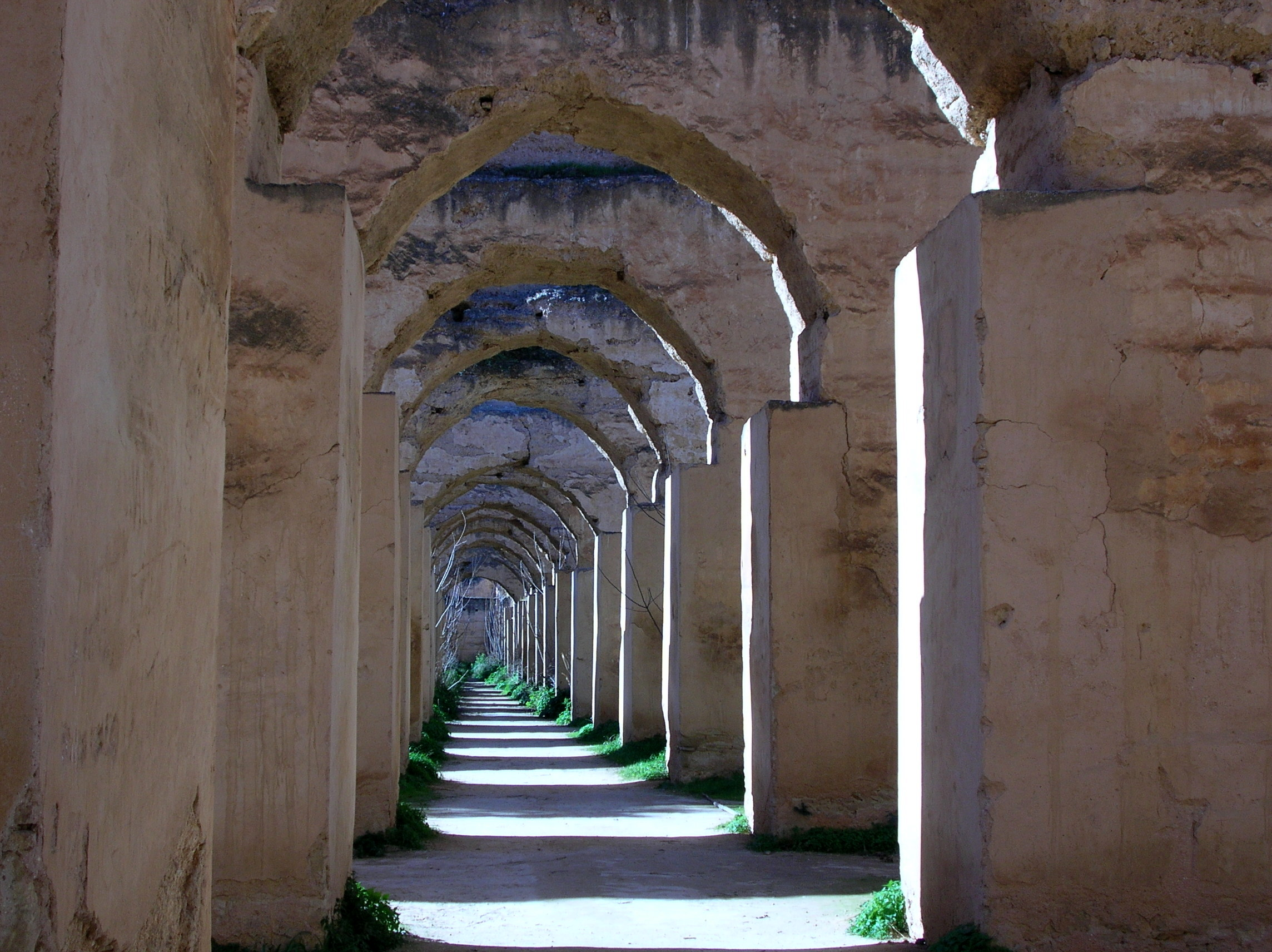
The royal stables of Heri es-Swani which could hold 12,000 horses

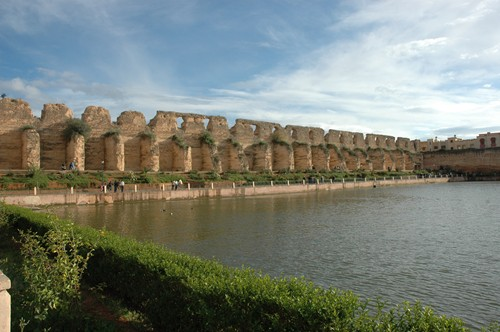
Sahrij Swani or Agdal Basin

He began the construction of his magnificent palace complex (or Kasbah) at Meknes before learning of the work being undertaken by Louis XIV at Versailles. According to European ambassadors present at Meknes in the period, the fortification walls of the palace alone were more than twenty-three kilometers long. Dar al-Kebira, the first of his palaces, was completed after three years of building and was immense, with hanging gardens modeled on those of Babylon. As soon as it was complete, he laid the foundations of Dar al-Makhzen, which linked together around fifty different palaces, containing their own hammams and its own mosque for his wives, concubines, and children. This was followed by Madinat er-Riyad, the residence of the viziers, governors, caids, secretaries, and other high functionaries of Ismail's court, which the historian Ahmad ibn Khalid al-Nasiri called 'the beauty of Meknes'. (Note: al-Nasiri 1906, p. 183.)

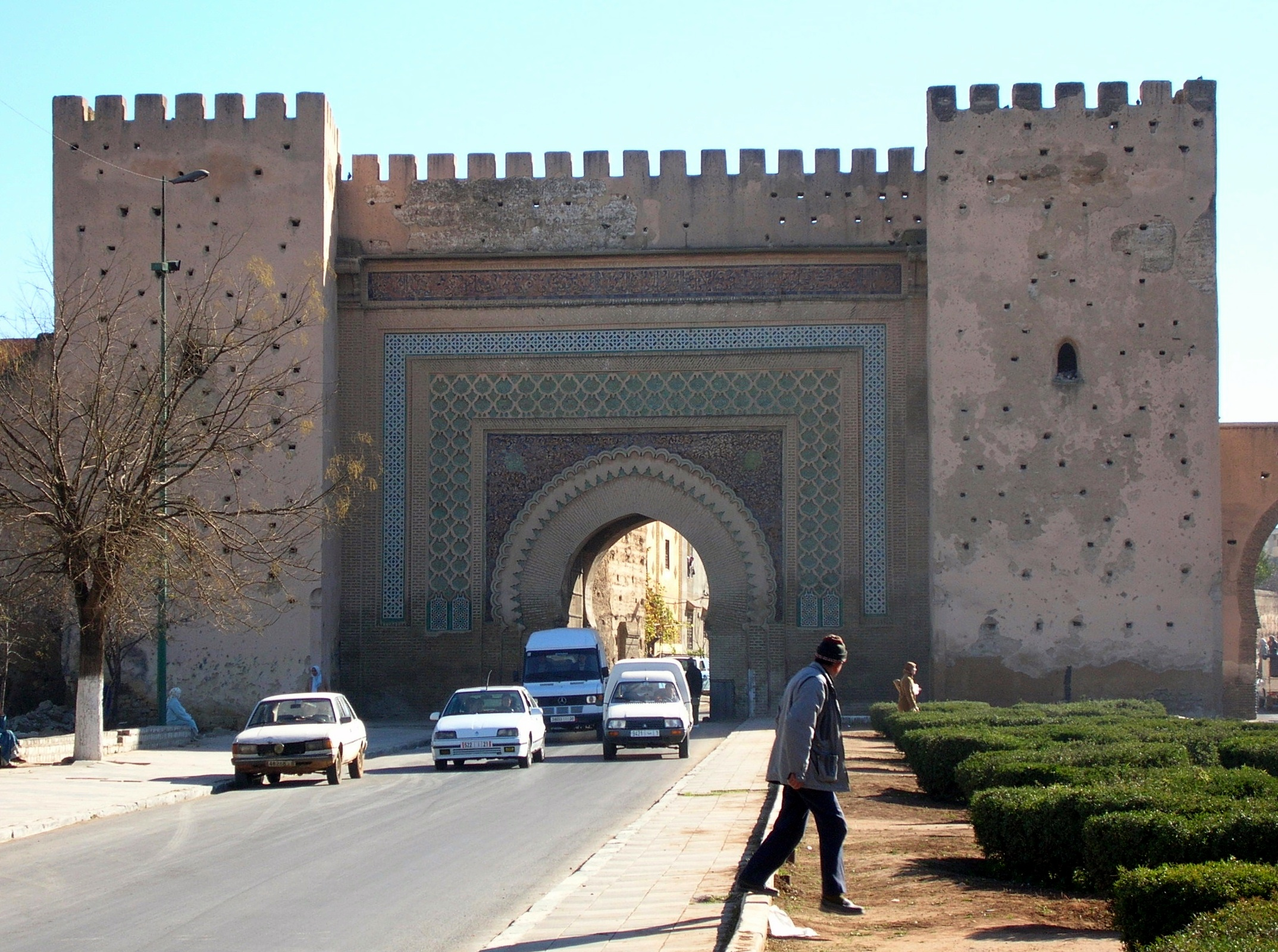
Bab El-Khemis, a city gate built during Moulay Ismail's reign

In the economic sphere, Moulay Ismail built within his citadel the Heri es-Swani (also spelled Heri es-Souani), a major storehouse of foodstuffs which was fed by wells, and the Agdal or Sahrij Reservoir which was dug to ensure a regular water supply for the gardens of Meknes. Ambassadors were received in the Qubbat al-Khayyatin pavilion which he built at the end of the seventeenth century. He also built prisons to hold criminals, Christian slaves, and prisoners of war. Finally, Ismail built or restored in Meknes a large number of mosques, madrasas, public squares, kasbahs, fountains, city gates, and gardens. Construction continued throughout his whole reign.

In the military sphere, Ismail ordered the construction of a network of sixty-seven fortresses, which lined the main roads and surrounded mountainous areas. Meknes was protected by forty kilometers of walls, pierced by twenty gatehouses. Control over the eastern part of the country was ensured by the construction of many strong forts along the border with Ottoman Algeria. Others were built in the territory of individual tribes, to maintain peace. He also built defensive structures along the route from the Oasis of Touat to the Chenguit provinces, and reorganised or rebuilt the walls of some cities on the model of Oujda. Garrisons of the Black Guards were protected by the construction of Kasbahs in major population centers, modeled on the Kasbah of Gnawa in Salé.

=== Military reforms ===
==== Army reforms ====
Around 1677, Moulay Ismail began to assert his authority over the whole country. Once he had killed and disabled his principal opponents, he was able to return to Meknes to organise his empire. It was during this fighting that he had the idea of creating the corps of the Abid al-Bukhari or Black Guard.

The 'Alawi army was principally composed of soldiers from the Saharan provinces and the provinces on the margin of the Sahara, such as Tafilalt, Souss, western Sahara, and Mauritania – the home of Khnata bint Bakkar, one of the four official wives of Ismail. The Banu Maqil, who inhabited these areas in great numbers, thus represented the foremost contingents of the 'Alawis until the middle of Moulay Ismail's reign, as they had under the Saadi dynasty. Several jayshes originated from these Arab tribes. The 'Alawis could also count on the tribes of the Oujda region, which had been conquered by Sidi Mohammed of Tafilalt. The jaysh tribes were exempted from import taxes to compensate them and were given land in exchange for their troops.

Portion of Alawite military forces also composed of Arab-Zenata Jaysh Cheraga, which Rashid ibn Sharif had originally installed in the area north of Fez. Khlot and Sherarda, tribes of Banu Hilal, were given the rank of Makhzen and formed several contingents in the Moroccan army. He also founded Jaysh al-Rifi, an independent army of Berber tribesmen from the eastern Rif. This group later played an important role in the 17th-century Moroccan wars against Spanish colonization.

However, Ismail could not rely solely on these tribes, because they had a long history of independence and could change sides or desert him at any moment. Thus he decided to create Morocco's first professional army, the Black Guard or Abid al-Bukhari, who were entirely beholden to him, unlike the tribal contingents. After the Siege of Marrakesh in 1672, he imported a large number of black male slaves from Sub-Saharan Africa and recruited many of the free black men in Morocco for his army. The initial contingent numbered perhaps 14,000 men. The Black Guard was rapidly expanded, reaching 150,000 men towards the end of Ismail's reign. The guards received a military education from age ten until their sixteenth birthday when they were enlisted in the army. They were married to black women who had been raised in the royal palace like them.

Moulay Ismail also created the Jaysh al-Udaya, which is to be distinguished from the tribe of Udaya. The guich was divided into three reha. The first of these reha was the Ahl Souss (house of Souss), which was composed of four Banu Maqil Arab tribes of Souss: Ulad Jerrar, Ulad Mtâa, Zirara, and the Chebanate. In the 16th century, these tribes had formed the core of the Saadi army, against the Jashem Arabs of Rharb who were part of Banu Hilal and included the Khlout and Safiane, who had supported the Marinid dynasty of Fez. The second reha was the Mghafra of Oued Noun, who were descended from Banu Maqil, Khnata bint Bakkar came from this group. The third reha contained the members of the tribe of Udaya itself. They were a powerful desert tribe who were originally from the Adrar Plateau and were formidable camel riders. Shortly before Moulay Ismail's reign, they had moved north and they were found in Souss under Moulay Ismail. After he reconquered Marrakesh in 1674, Ismail encountered a poor shepherd of the Udaya called Bou-Chefra and learned that his people had been forced to leave the desert because of the drought and were originally Banu Maqil like himself. Sympathizing with their plight, the Sultan decided to turn them into an elite division of his army.

The Jaysh al-Udaya became a major portion of Sultan's army, governed by the principle of makhzen in which land was granted to soldiers in exchange for military service. According to the historian Simon Pierre, "After the Alaouite conquest, the people of the Maghreb had been despoiled and disarmed and, except for one Berber tribe and the Rifians, only the Abid al-Bukhari and the Udaya exercised the monopoly on violence. Thirty years later, at the death of Moulay Ismail in 1727, it was the caids of the Abid al-Bukhari and the Udaya who joined with the ulama of Meknes and the ministers to choose sultan Moulay Ahmed Adh-Dhahabî!" However, other sources state that Moulay Ismail had designated him as his successor before his death. Regardless, during the period of anarchy after Ismail's death, the Udaya certainly played a major role in deposing several Sultans along with the Abid al-Bukhari.

Additionally, Moulay Ismail was able to make use of European renegades' knowledge and experience of artillery, when he formed them into a military corps, Michael Peyron has noted the sultan employed renegade Spanish gunners to operate his cannon batteries, as it recorded during his conquest of Fêzzâz in 1692.

==== Defensive organisation ====
By the end of his reign, Ismail had built more than 76 kasbahs and military posts throughout his territory. Each kasbah was defended by a force of at least 100 soldiers drawn from the jaysh tribes or the Black Guard. Moroccan forces were stationed in all the major cities and provincial capitals. For example, there were 3,000 Cheraga, 4,500 Sherarda, and 2,000 Udaya stationed around Fez, which formed a defensive cordon against the unsubjugated Berber tribes in the area.

The kasbahs ensured the defence of the eastern border, where there was a heavy Moroccan military presence, but they also protected the main lines of communication within the kingdom and facilitated the control of unsubjugated tribes, by continuously raiding them.

=== Diplomacy ===
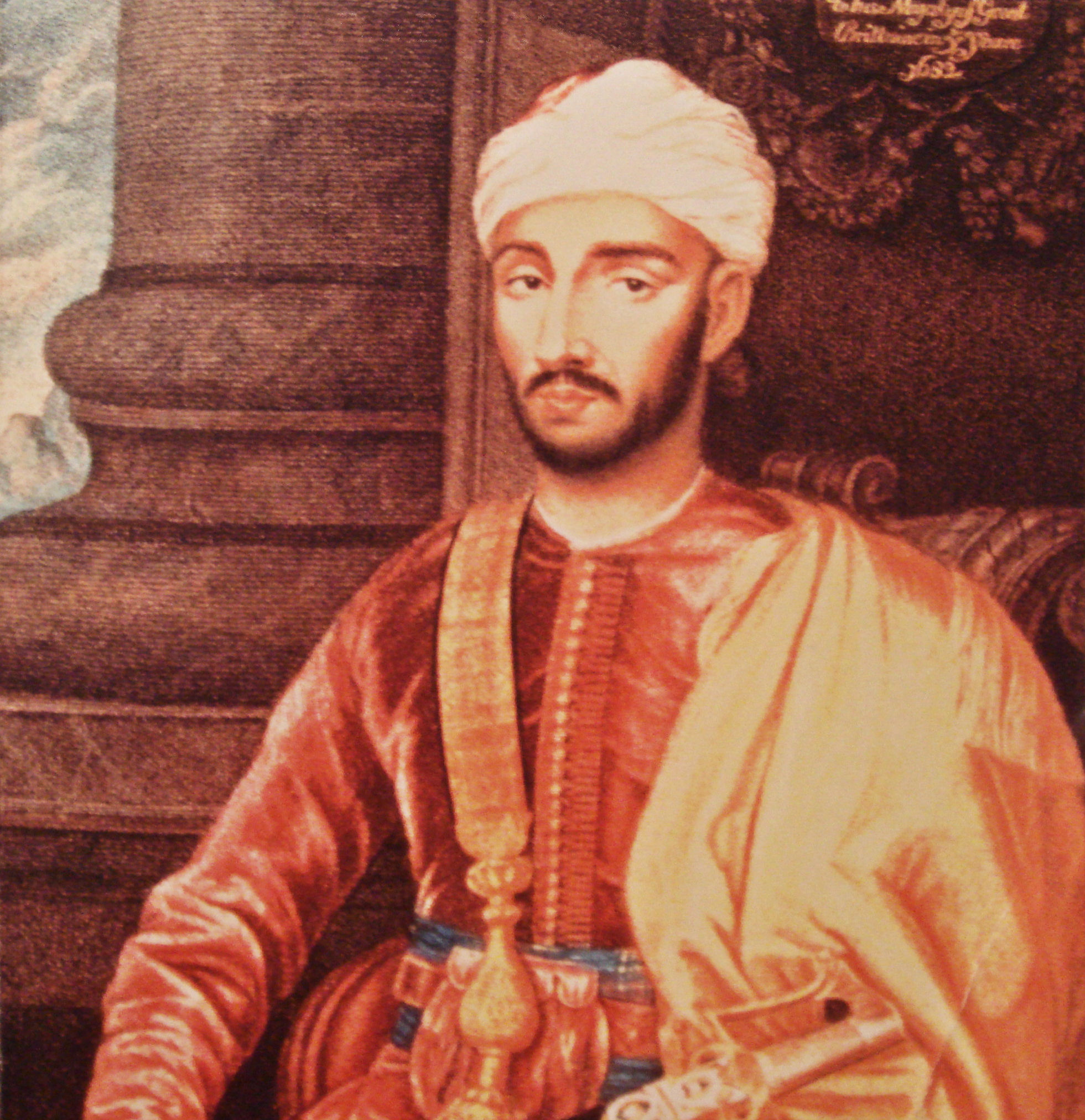
Mohammed bin Hadou, Mulay Ismail's Moroccan ambassador to Great Britain in 1682

Morocco's relations with the Ottoman Empire and its possessions in North Africa were often very strained. The two powers always distrusted one another and this was particularly true during Ismail's reign. The Ottomans supported Ismail's rivals within Morocco both financially and militarily, repeatedly mounting expeditions to support them. Conversely, Moulay Ismail led several invasions and raids of their territory, often with the

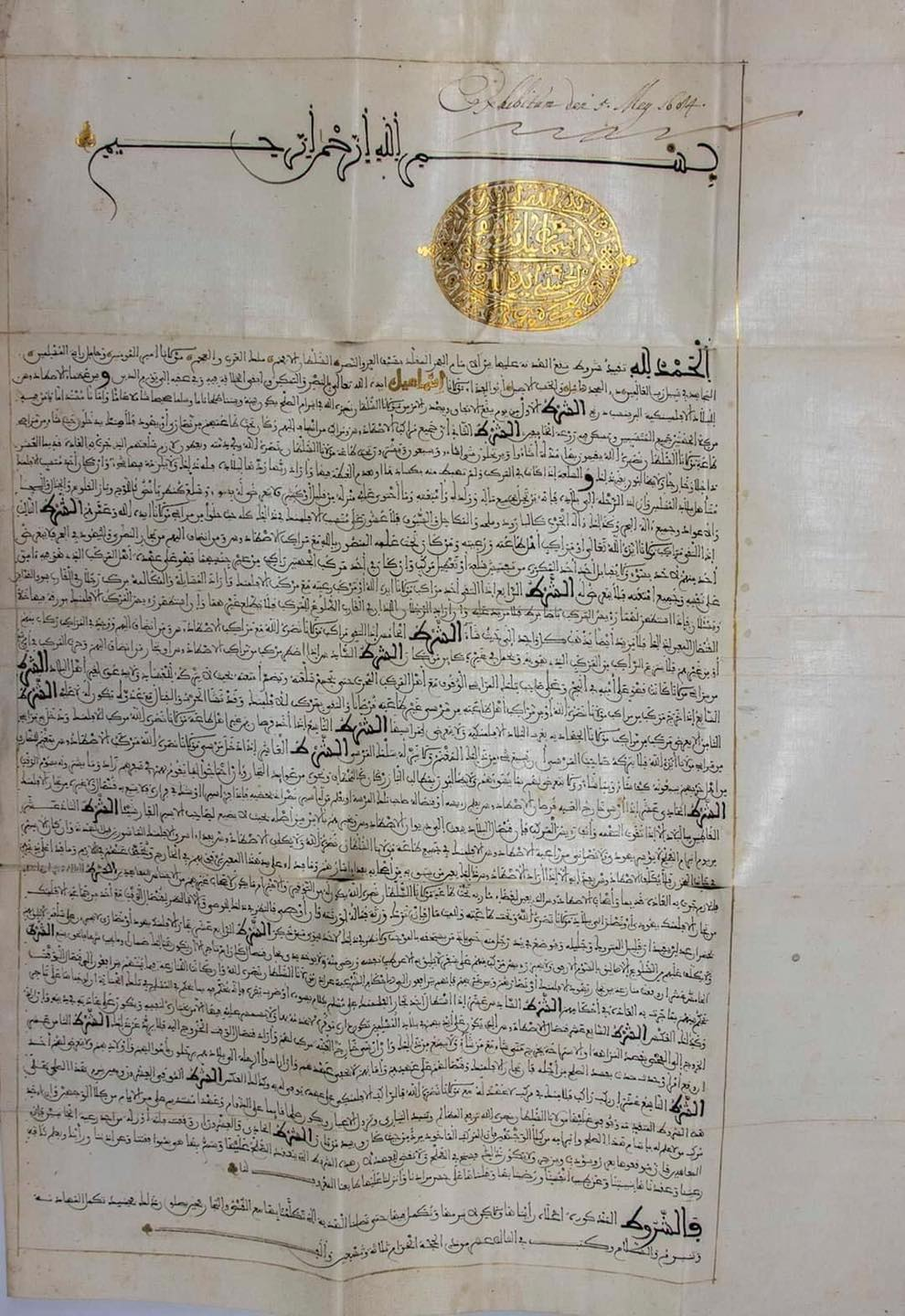
A 1682 peace treaty with the Dutch Republic

support of anti-Ottoman Arab tribes in Algeria, such as the Benu Amer. The two empires repeatedly signed peace treaties, notably in 1678, 1692, and 1693, none of which lasted very long. A final treaty, in 1701, held until the end of Ismail's life.

Following the approach to foreign policy begun by Abu Marwan Abd al-Malik I, Moulay Ismail sought good relations with France and Great Britain to ensure trade relations. These relations centered on the sale of Christian sailors captured at sea by the Salé Rovers and others, but also the creation of military alliances. Moulay Ismail repeatedly sought French assistance in his wars with Spain, without success. However, an alliance with France and the Bey of Tunis against Algeria was arranged.

In 1682, Moulay Ismail sent Mohammad Temim on an embassy to France. He succeeded in negotiating a treaty of friendship between Morocco and France, which was signed at Saint-Germain-en-Laye. A request for the hand in marriage of Mlle de Nantes, one of Louis XIV's illegitimate children, was not successful. A second embassy to France was led by Abdallah ben Aisha in 1699. However, the accession of Louis XIV's grandson Philip to the Spanish throne in 1710 doomed this alliance, resulting in the breaking of diplomatic relations with France and Spain and the departure of the French and Spanish merchants and consuls from Morocco in 1718. The French diplomats considered Moulay Ismail extremely greedy. They complained that he undertook negotiations and

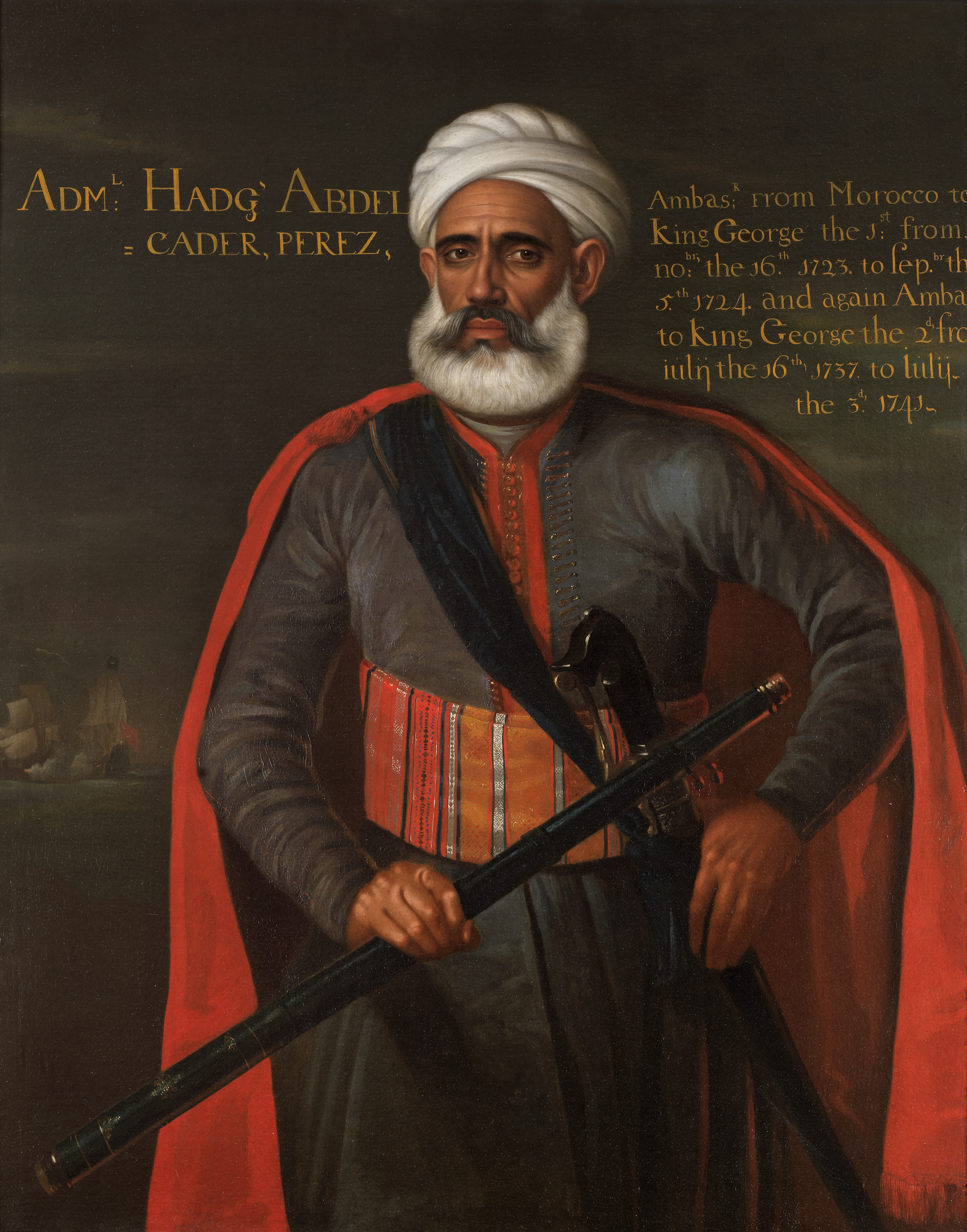
Ambassador Admiral Abdelkader Pérez' was sent by Ismail ibn Sharif to England in 1723

made agreements solely to receive presents, denying whatever they had proposed once he had gotten what he wanted.

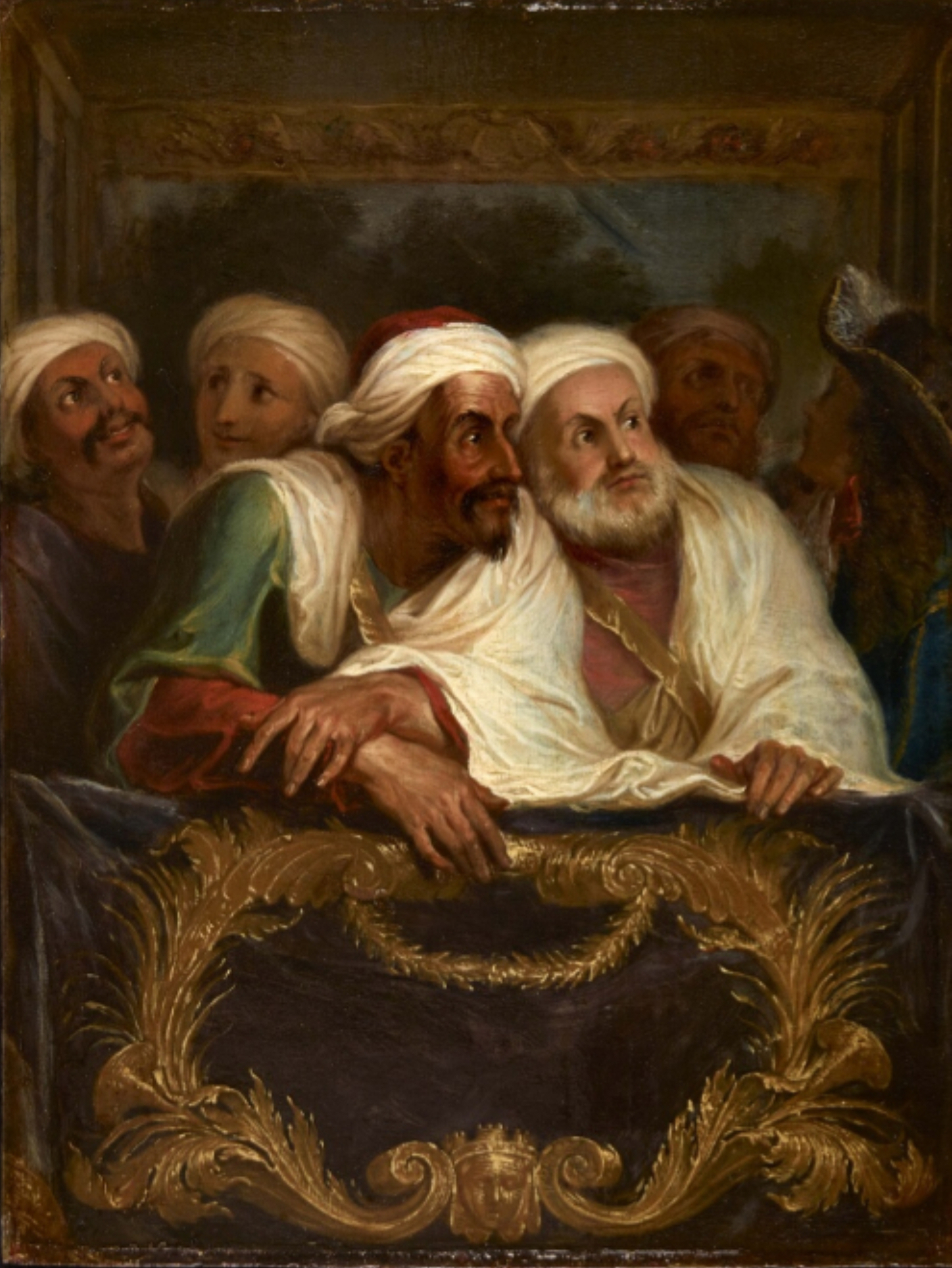
Mohammad Temim, Ambassadeur du Maroc, à la Comédie Italienne (1682), Antoine Coypel (1661–1722), Versailles

Despite Ismail's conquest of Tangier in 1684, the English supported him against the Spanish and signed several treaties of friendship and commerce. The English participated in the blockade of the Spanish port of Ceuta in 1704, during Ismail's siege of the city. After the break of relations with France, Moroccan ties with Britain increased. Abdelkader Pérez was sent to two embassies to Britain, in 1723 and 1737. Moulay Ismail also sent several embassies to James II after he was deposed, offering him aid and asking him to convert to Islam.

== Family and personal life ==
Moulay Ismail was a serial polygamist. According to the writings of the French Trinitarian priest Father Dominique Busnot, Moulay Ismail had at least 500 concubines and at least 600 living children in 1704, which did not include his daughters by his four principal wives. Busot reports the rumor that any others were ordered to be strangled at birth. Historian Abd al-Rahman Ibn Zaydan recorded children of around 68 wedded wives and eight unnamed slave concubines from the royal birth registers kept during the reign of Sidi Mohammed III. He specifies that upon Ismail's death the full number of his wives and harem slave concubines was 700. The final total is uncertain: the Guinness Book of Records claims 1,042, with no source. Based on Busnot's 1704 figures, Elisabeth Oberzaucher and Karl Grammer of the University of Vienna calculated Ismail could have fathered approximately 1,171 children in a 32-year reproductive span. The historian Al Zayani, who was in charge of royal protocol under Sultan Sidi Mohammed III, recounts that with his own eyes he saw the exhaustive list of Moulay Ismail's children and that his descendants occupied 500 houses in Sijilmasa. He also specified that the list to which he had access did not contain the names of Moulay Ismail's children who had no descendants.

A partial restoration of Moulay Ismail's descent through his wives and slave concubines is listed below. His first recorded marriage was in 1670; the order of his nuptials are unclear after his first recorded spouse. Posterity did not remember many of the full names of his wives, and following Muslim traditions, slave concubines do not have a last name, and are renamed at the time of their conversion to Islam. Their birth names were not subject to meticulous safeguarding, which is why few of these women are identifiable by their birth name. The descendants of his wives who have a full name or biography are listed first, then those of his wives who do not have a full name, then a partial list of his descendants through his slave concubines:

- A daughter of a Saadi prince, married on 5 April 1670, at Dar Ben Chegra in Fez. According to Al Zayani it was during the month of Shawwal, while Ahmad ibn Khalid an-Nasiri states it took place 14 of Dhu al-Qadah 1080 in Islamic calendar. The wedding probably took place between the two dates thus March to 5 April 1670, AD, as royalty often had a seven-days wedding. Whether they had issue is not stated.
- A daughter of Shaykh Al-Lawati who was the widow of his half-brother Sultan Moulay Rashid. She was from the oriental Rif region, her father was Cheick of his Arab Maqil or Berber tribe. The wedding happened after 9 April 1672, but his date of marriage is unclear. Whether they had issue is not stated.
- Lalla Aisha Mubarka. The origins of this lady are unclear, initially, she was a jarya (slave concubine) of Sultan Moulay Rashid. Sources claim that Moulay Ismail brought her from his brother in the early 1670s and ended up marrying her. (Note: El Hamel 2014, pp. 192–193) Lalla Aisha Mubarka (or Zaydana after her firstborn son Zaydan) was one of Moulay Ismail's much-esteemed wives. She was described as a woman of great intuition. About her, Moulay Ismail was quoted saying that: "she was wiser than most men". She had substantial influence over Ismail and sought to get her son Moulay Zaydan enthroned for many years before he was finally secretly executed by his father in 1708. They had several children among them Moulay Zaydan, Sultan Moulay Ahmad al-Dhahbi and Sultan Moulay Ali.
- Lalla Ma'azuza Malika. In the late 1720s John Braithwaite member of the British consulate in Morocco explains that Ma'azuza was not so much in the favors of Moulay Ismail. Their sons were Sultan Moulay Abdalmalik, Moulay Abd al Rahman and Moulay Hussein.
- Lalla Khanatha bint Bakkar, married in 1678. She was from the Mghafra tribe of the Awlad Hassān, the aristocratic caste of the Beidane. Khnata bint Bakkar, daughter of the Grand Sheikh Bakkar al-Mghafri, was famous for her beauty, intelligence, and learning. Her family seat is in the region of Sbouya, commonly referred to as Oued Noun. Her children with Moulay Ismail are Moulay Mohammed, Moulay Hafiz, Moulay Mehrez, Moulay Mohammed al-Mutais and Sultan Moulay Abdallah.
- Lalla Alwa Benabiz. They had ten children seven sons and three daughters, one of whom was Moulay Ṣafā (Muley Spha), he was Thomas Pellow's first master.
- Lalla Aouda Doukalia, date of wedding unknown. Her surname might suggest origins from the Doukkala tribe. Their children were Sultan Al-Mustadi, Moulay Bi'nassir, another Moulay Hussein, and other unnamed children.
- Princess Nassira el-Salwi bint Mohammed el-Heyba originally from Brakna, married the latter either in 1678/9 or in 1690. Whether they had descendants is not indicated.
- Lalla Halima Al Sufyaniyah, married around 1707 (Thomas Pellow accounts of her favorite son aged 8 circa 1715). She was from the Doukkala region and is the daughter of Cheikh Ali bin Hussein of Bani Sweid, from the Sufiyan tribe of Hilali Arab origins. Her son was Moulay Zeydan Seghir (born c. 1707).
- Lalla Um'el'Iz Tabba'a, date of wedding and origins unknown. Her son was another Moulay Abdallah.
- Abhar Doukalia, she was the mother of Mussa al-Hadi.
- Fatima Ouardighiya, her son is a third son named Abdallah.
- Zahra al-Malikiya, she was the mother of Al-Ishwa and Al-Cheick Saghir.
- Mask'al'Juyub Soufiyania, she was the mother of Abd al-Malik.
- Rahma al Salaouia. she was a native of Salé, her son is Mohammed.
- Fidah Doukalia, she was the mother of Abdallah Boumnad.
- Maria al-Aljaa, she was the mother of Moulay Binaser and Al-Mu'atamid.
- Sounah al-Dir'iyah, she was the mother of Al-Walid al Mouthalath.
- Ruqiya al-Saidiya (not Sa'adiya), she was the mother of Mohammed.
- Um'el'Saad Malikiya, her sons are Al Harran and Mehrez.
- Jamila al-Malikiya, She was the mother of Moulay Moustada.

Below the name Chaouia means an origin from Chaouia, a geographical area which can also be a tribe. A large number of Moulay Ismail's wives were designated as "Chaouia". Listed below is the descendants he had with his wives, of which only a part of their names are recorded: their tribal origins or their first name. It is unsure wheteher the women whom only their first name is given were all born free Muslims. The fact that only their first name is retained may indicate slave status, therefore lacking a family name or tribal affiliation. His numerous descendants include:

- Lalla Amina and her full brother Sidi Mohammed: their mother is Chaouia.
- Prince Suleiman al Kabir: his mother is Chaouia.
- Sultan Sidi Mohammed and another daughter named Amina: their mother is Chaouia.
- Rachid, Binaser and Binaser: their mother is Hayaniya. Meaning from the Hyayna tribe.
- Abdel Karim, Harran, Hicham, Fadel and Lalla Sakina: their mother's name is Abla.
- Al Mouktadir: his mother is Doukalia.
- Abi Marwan du Sous and Abu Faris: their mother's name is Haniya.
- Abu Kacim: his mother is Za'ariye. Meaning from the Zaer tribe.
- Abdeslam, Mohammed al Dayf, Mohammed Al Mustadi Abbas, Mohammed Al Muntasir, Mohammed Al Rashid, Sulaiman, Mohammed Telgui, Mohammed Al Mouhtadi, Mohammed Al Walid, Hassan and Idris: their mother is Taliqiya. Meaning from Tliq tribe.
- Nasser: his mother is Marrakchiya, meaning a native of Marrakesh.
- Fatoum (nickname for Fatima) and al-Fadil: their mother is Alja (umahu aljaa).
- Moulay Abou Nasser: his mother is Dlimiya, meaning from the Oulad Delim tribe.
- Hafid al Ikhlaf, Moulay Ali and Prince al-Mouhtadi (Who revolted in Salé during the reign of his brother Sidi Mohammed): their mother is Chaouia.
- Suleiman al Saghir and al-Taqaa: their mother is Malikiya. Meaning from Beni Malik tribe.
- Abdelhaq: his mother is Malikiya.
- Khaled al-Hutha, al-Rachid al Kabir and Mohammed: their mother is from the Awlad Hmami tribe.
- Mohammed al Habib: his mother's name is Zubaida.
- Sultan Moulay Zine El Abidine, Jaafar and Moussa: their mother is Chaouia.
- Al-Mamune Saghir: his mother is Chaouia.
- A second son named Idriss, al-Mehdi and Lalla Sitt al-Mulk: their mother is Chaouia.
- Asrur al-Safah, Mehrez, al-Mu'tedad and Mohammed al Gharfi: their mother is Chaouia.
- Al Taher and Abd al Malik: their mother is Doukalia.
- Al-Wallad and Sidi Issa Idriss: their mother is Shams al-Dhuha Chaouia.
- Al-Cherif and al-Murtaja: their mother is Chaouia.
- Said al Saghir: his mother is Hayania.
- Abd al-Kadir: his mother is from the Awlad Asfir tribe.
- Abd al-Mamun: his mother is Tadlaouia, meaning a native of Tadla.
- Al-Walid al Kebir: his mother is Fulania, which means Fulani in Arabic.
- Al-Mu'atamid: his mother is Malikiya.
- Al-Hakim and al-Kebir: his mother is Doukaliya.
- Moulay Moubarak: his mother is Doukaliya.
- Abd al-Wahid: his mother is Malikiya.
- Al-Salem, Haroun and Sitt al-Nafissa: their mother is Kawthar Chaouia.
- Abu Faris ([father of Moulay Mehrez whose son Hassan and 25 other boys] the latter killed the sons of his brother Moulay Youssef in 1748 [1162 AH 60] and caused damage to his nephew Moulay Cherif ben Zine El Abidine), al-Othmani and another son named Sidi Mohammed: their mother is a native of Thaghr Azamour.
- Abdallah and al-Talib: their mother is Kinawiya.
- Othman al-Thani: his mother is Malikiya.
- Taya: his mother is from the Awlad al-Haj tribe, an Arab tribe.
- Al Mu'atasim and another daughter named Sitt al Mulk: their mother is Aljaa.
- Al-Chérif and Lalla Safia: their mother is Chaouia.
- Mohammed: his mother is Talikiya.
- Suleiman: his mother is Jami'iya. Meaning from Ouled Jamaa tribe
- An unnamed daughter, Mu'awiya and al-Hassan: their mother's name is al-Bustan, she was a native of Debdou.
- Al-Qaim: his mother's name is Khalia.
- Moulay Abu Marwan and Youssef: their mother is Em'nebhiye, from the Mnebha tribe.
- Al-Muktafi: his mother is Dukaliya.
- A second son named Abd-el Rahman: his mother is Chaouia.
- Abd-el Rahman al Muthalath: his mother is Malkiya (not to be confused with the spelling Malikiya).
- A fourth son named Abdallah: his mother is Hasiniya.
- Al Mu'tamid al Saghir: his mother is Chaouia.
- Mohammed al-Aqra' and Suleiman: their mother is from the Sufiyan tribe.
- Mohammed: his mother is Boukhariya (probably a slave of Abid al-Bukhari).
- Moulay Taleb: his mother's name is Malika.

Many of his concubines are only fragmentary documented. As concubines, they were slave captives, sometimes from Europe. Here is list of children he had with some of his slave concubines from the harem, as well as the details known about their mother:

- Moulay Mohammed Alim and Moulay Cherif: their mother is al-Darah, a Spanish slave concubine. She was his favorite and Moulay Ismail educated himself their son Moulay Mohammed Alim, his once favorite son. Around 1702, Al-Darah tragically died strangled by Moulay Ismail whom Lalla Aisha had made believe she had betrayed him.
- Cheick al-Kabir: his mother is a slave concubine designated as ama.
- Daoud: his mother is a slave concubine designated as ama.
- Al-Said: his mother is a slave of the Awlad Sidi ben Issa tribe who was offered as a slave concubine to Moulay Ismaïl.
- Abd-al Hadi al Kabir, Abd-al Hadi Saghir: their mother is a slave concubine designated as ama.
- Youssef Saghir: his mother is a slave concubine designated as ama.
- A son, born to an English slave concubine Lalla Balqis (born 1670). She was captured by Barbary pirates in 1685, at the age of fifteen, while traveling with her mother to the Barbados. She was sold at the slave market in Morocco and given as a gift to the sultan. Converted to Islam under the name Balqis and included in his harem, she was one of Moulay Ismail's favorites. She became a privileged and influential concubine. Her influence in the harem was so well known that she was among the harem women who received diplomatic gifts from the British ambassador Charles Stewart during his visit to Meknes in 1721.

At one point in her life, an Irish woman named Mrs Shaw was one of Moulay Ismail's concubines. She was enslaved and taken to his harem, where she was forced to convert to Islam whenever he wished to have relations with her. Eventually, however, the Sultan grew tired of her and she was freed and married off to a Spanish convert. As her new husband was very poor, contemporary witnesses described her as being reduced to begging, before she was helped by John Russell, the British consul general.

== Legacy ==
After nearly a century of difficulty and division, Morocco had experienced peace under Moulay Ismail, who had pacified all parts of the country. His reign is considered a golden age in the country's history, during which it experienced, security, tranquility, and order. The historian Ahmad ibn Khalid al-Nasiri, who recorded the whole history of Morocco in this period, declared:

The evildoers and troublemakers no longer knew where to shelter, where to seek refuge: no land wanted to bear them, no sky would cover them. (Note: al-Nasiri 1906, p. 135.)

— Ahmad ibn Khalid al-Nasiri, Kitab Al-Istiqsa

Moulay Ismail accomplished the political reunification of the whole country, the formation of its main military force – the Black Guard or Abid al-Bukhari, as well as the Jaysh al-Rifi, and recaptured several coastal cities from the Europeans. He had considerably extended Moroccan territory, (Note: al-Nasiri 1906, p. 138.) and undertook an extraordinary amount of construction. (Note: al-Nasiri 1906, p. 139.)

After Moulay Ismaïl's death at the age of eighty (or around ninety by the 1634 birthdate) in 1727, there was another succession battle between his surviving sons. His successors continued with his building program, but in 1755 the huge palace compound at Meknes was severely damaged by an earthquake. By 1757 his grandson, Sidi Mohammad III moved the capital to Marrakesh.

Ismail ibn Sharif is mentioned in chapter 11 of Voltaire's Candide. The character of the sultan in the novel "The Sultan's Wife" by Jane Johnson is based on Moulay Ismaïl. In Marguerite Henry's King of the Wind "Sultan Mulai Ismael, Emperor of all Morocco" sends six Arabian horses to Louis XV, "the boy-King of France".

== See also ==
- History of North Africa
- History of Morocco
- Anglo-Moroccan alliance
- List of people with the most children
- Thomas Pellow, who was captured and enslaved for 20 years under Ismail

== Sources ==
- Castries, Henry, ed. (1903). Moulay Ismail et Jacques II; une apologie de l'Islam par un sultan du Maroc [Moulay Ismail and Jacques II; an apology for Islam by a Sultan of Morocco].
- al-Nasiri, Ahmad ibn Khalid (1906). The Book of Investigation for News of the Nations of the Islamic Far West. Vol. 2. Paris.
- Bloom, Jonathan M. (2020). Architecture of the Islamic West: North Africa and the Iberian Peninsula, 700–1800. Yale University Press. pp. 263–267. ISBN 978-0-300-21870-1.
- Parker, Richard (1981). A practical guide to Islamic Monuments in Morocco. Charlottesville, VA: The Baraka Press.
- Mission scientifique au Maroc, Archives marocaines [Scientific mission to Morocco, Moroccan Archives]. Vol. 18. Paris: Ernest Leroux. 1912. "Publication de la Mission scientifique au Maroc"
- Hamet, Ismaël; Bokhari, Les Abid; Mohammed ben Abdallah, Sidi; Slimane, Moulay; Aderrahmane, Moulay (1923). "6". Les Chérifs Filaliens: Les chérifs filaliens ou hassaniens. – Moulay Rachid au Tafilalt, puis à Fez. – Moulay Ismaïl (1672–1727) [Filalian Cherifs: The filalian or Hassanian sheriffs. – Moulay Rachid in Tafilalt, then in Fez. – Moulay Ismail (1672–1727]. Paris: Ernest Leroux. "dans Histoire du Maghreb : Cours professé à l'Institut des hautes études marocaines"
- de Castries, Henry (1927). Les Sources inédites de l'Histoire du Maroc. Deuxième série. Dynastie Filalienne [The Unpublished Sources of the History of Morocco]. Paris: Publication de la Section Historique au Maroc. "Archives de la Bibliothèque de France. Tome III"
- Direction générale des affaires indigènes, Archives marocaines [Directorate General of Indigenous Affairs, Moroccan Archives] (in French). Vol. 28. Paris. 1931. "Publication de la Direction générale des affaires indigènes (section sociologique)"
- Audiffret (1821). Oeuvres de Le Sage [Note on the life and works of the sage]. Paris: A.A. Renouard.
- Bensoussan, David, ed. (2012). l était une fois le Maroc [Once upon a time in Morocco].
- Marchat, Philippe (2013). Le Maroc et les puissances: un empire convoité de 711 à 1942 [Morocco and the powers: a coveted empire from 711 to 1942]. Paris: L'Harmattan.
- Abitbol, Michel, ed. (2009). Histore du Maroc [History of Morocco].
- Ogot, Bethwell (1998). International Scientific Committee for the drafting of a General History of Africa. UNESCO. ISBN 92-3-202497-7.
- Ben Ahmed Ezziâni (1886). Le Maroc de 1631 à 1812 [Morocco between 1631-1812].
- Figueras, Garcia; Saint-Cyr, Joulia (1973). Larache: datos para su historia en el siglo XVII [Larache: data for its history in the 17th century]. Instituto de Estudios Africanos, Consejo Superior de Investigaciones Científicas. ISBN 84-500-6144-X.
- Rézette, Robert, ed. (1976). The Spanish enclaves in Morocco.
- Braithwaite, John, ed. (1729). The History of the Revolution in the Empire of Morocco upon the Death of the late Emperor Muley Ishmael.
- Mouette, Germain (2010). The travels of the Sieur Mouette, in the Kingdoms of Fez and Morocco, during his eleven years captivity in those parts. ISBN 978-1-140-97129-0.
- Les Alaouites, Mohammed VI: Une dynastie, un règne (pdf), Les documents de L'Économiste (in French), Casablanca: L'Économiste, 2009
- El Hamel, Chouki (2014). Black Morocco A History of Slavery, Race, and Islam. United States: Cambridge University Press. ISBN 978-1-139-62004-8.

Preceded by Al-Rashid	Sultan of Morocco; 1672–1727	Succeeded by Ahmad
