= Aouda Doukalia =

- Spouse: Moulay Ismail
- Issue: Al-Mostadi ben Ismail; Moulay Bi'Nassir; Moulay al-Hussein
- House: Alaouite (by marriage)
- Religion: Islam

Aouda Doukalia (Arabic: عودة دكالية) was one of the wives of the Alaouite Sultan Moulay Ismail and the mother of Sultan Al-Mostadi ben Ismail.

She was native of Doukkala. In 1738 she entered in negotiations with the General of the Abid al-Bukhari to seat her son Moulay Mostadi on the throne. They accepted and crowned him in place of Sultan Mohammed ben Ismail who was thus overthrown.

Her son Moulay Mostadi sealed stronger alliances than his predecessors, he was the greatest obstacle for Moulay Abdallah and several battles resulted between these two sultans.
