= Nassira el-Salwi bint Mohammed el-Heyba =

- Spouse: Moulay Ismail
- House: Alaouite (by marriage)
- Father: Mohammed el-Heyba ould Normach
- Religion: Islam

Nassira el-Salwi bint Mohammed el-Heyba ould Normach (Arabic: نصيرة السلوي بنت محمد الهيبة ولد نغماش) was a Hassanid princess of the Emirate of Brakna. She was one of the wives of the Alaouite Sultan Moulay Ismail.

== Biography ==
Nassira was the daughter of the emir of Brakna, Mohammed el-Heyba ould Normach, the elder branch of Brakna emirs of the Mghafra tribe. Nassira is often confused with her distant cousin Khanatha bint Bakkar from the Mghrafra tribe established in Oued Noun. From this confusion lies uncertainty as to the date of Nassira's marriage, with some sources citing that she married Moulay Ismail between 1678 and 1679, like Khanatha. On the other hand, it is also possible that Nassira was the Hassan Princess who married Moulay Ismail in 1690 following a duel he won; preceded by her request for annexation for all the peoples of the Sahara, where this princess gave her hand upon her defeat, as a guarantee of the status of tributary of her people. During the duel, she fought him hard at first, but then allowed herself to be overpowered.
