= John Braithwaite (author) =

English author

John Braithwaite (1696–1740), was an English writer.

== Career ==
Braithwaite (also spelt Brathwaite and other variants) was the author of The History of the Revolution in the Empire of Morocco upon the Death of the late Emperor Muley Ishmael, published in 1729 and translated into Dutch in 1729, German in 1730, and French in 1731. In his preface Braithwaite describes himself as being in the service of the African Company, and as having, when very young, served in the fleet in Anne's reign, and then having been a lieutenant in the Welsh fusiliers, ensign in the Royal Guards, and secretary to his kinsman Christian Cole, the British resident at Venice, with whom he travelled through Europe. Braithwaite married Christian's niece Silvia, whose father was a merchant in Amsterdam.

He also states that he was in the Saint Lucia and Saint Vincent expeditions, and was present at the siege of Gibraltar (1727). Thence he crossed to Morocco and joined the British consul-general, John Russel, in his expedition in the emperor's dominions, the experiences of which he relates in his book. The diary of the narrative extends from July 1727 to February 1728.

== Death and family ==
Col John Braithwaite was killed when the vessel "Baltick Merchant" was attacked and captured by a Franco-Spanish privateer (the "Biscaya") off the Scilly Isles. Braithwaite was murdered after the surrender. He was survived by his wife, Silvia (née Cole), his elder daughter Caroline, who married Robert Armitage, his only son Major-General Sir John Braithwaite, 1st Baronet and a younger daughter, Sylvia. The last is assumed to have been born after the death of Colonel Braithwaite. She married the poet Bonnell Thornton. Her mother remarried Reverend Thomas Winstanley and had a further son, Thomas, who died at 21. The elder Silvia died in 1799.

A Captain Braithwaite is mentioned in the London Gazette as being appointed in 1749 to command the Peggy sloop, and again in 1761 as commanding the Shannon. However, this was Richard Braithwaite, a younger cousin.

In February 1768, a John Braithwaite was removed from the post of secretary to the governor of Gibraltar; but it is certain this is not Col John Braithwaite.
