= Lalla Sitt al-Mulk =

Alawi princess

Lalla Sitt al-Mulk للاة ست الملك
- Born: before 1679
Names
- Lalla Sitt al-Mulk bint Ismail al-Thamin
- House: Alaouite dynasty
- Father: Ismail ibn Sharif
- Religion: Islam

Princess Lalla Sitt al-Mulk bint Ismail (in Arabic: للاة ست الملك بنت إسماعيل) was an Alawi princess and the daughter of Ismail Ibn Sharif, Sultan of Morocco.

== Biography ==
Lalla Sitt al-Mulk was the daughter of sultan Moulay Ismail. Her mother was from the Chaouia historical region in Western Morocco. Her full-blooded brothers were Moulay Idris and Moulay al-Mahdi.

In the year AH 1101 (1689/90) she traveled to Mecca from Morocco to complete Hajj with the scholar Al-Hasan al-Yusi.
