= Al-Mostadi of Morocco =

Al-Mostadi bin Isma'il (Arabic: المستضيء بن اسماعيل, d. 1760 / 1164 of the Hijra) was a sultan of the 'Alawi dynasty of Morocco who ruled at various intervals from 1738 to 1748, revolting against his brother Abdallah of Morocco a number of times. He is a son of Ismail Ibn Sharif.
