= Ibn Zaydan =

Moroccan writer (1873–1946)

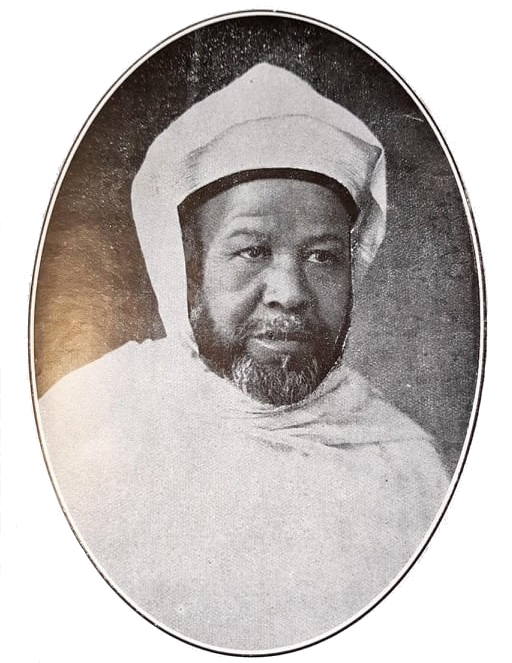
Ibn Zaydan in 1933

Abd al-Rahman ibn Zaydan (Arabic: عبد الرحمن ابن زيدان) (June 1873 – 1946) was a Moroccan historian and literary author. He was a member of the ruling 'Alawi dynasty and is considered one of the best sources on the history of his native city Meknes, but also on the 'Alawi dynasty. After the installation of the French protectorate he accepted the function of vice-director of the military school of Dâr al-Bayda in Meknes, today's military academy of the city. The Ithaf, his main work of eight volumes, comprehends hundreds of biographies, like those of the sultans Abderrahman and Hassan I.

== Bibliography ==
- Abderrahman Ibn Zaydan's masterpiece on the city of Meknes: A Presentation of Luminous Men with the most beautiful Reports of the City of Meknes [in Arabic], 5 vols, Fes, 1930, Reprinted, Casablanca: Ideal, 1990
- Abbas Jarari, Said Binsaid Alawi and Ahmad Tawfiq Abd al-Rahman ibn Zaydan (Festschrift), Muassasat Una: 1998
- Abd al-Rahman bin Zaydan al-Alawi. al-'Ala'iq al-siyasiyah lil-dawlah al-'Alawiyah / taqdim wa-tahqiq 'Abd al-Latif al-Shadhili. Rabat : al-Matba'ah al-Malakiyah, 1999.
- Afif, Mohamed. "Les Harkas, hassaniennes d'après l'oeuvre d'Ibn Zaydan." Hespéris-Tamuda 19 (1980–81): 153–68.
- Les campagnes de Moulay ’Al-Hassan d’après les écrits d’Ibn Zaydan,. Revue de la Faculté des Lettres (Rabat), 7, 1981, 47-75 (en arabe)
