= List of ambassadors of Morocco to the United Kingdom =

Ambassador of Morocco to the United Kingdom

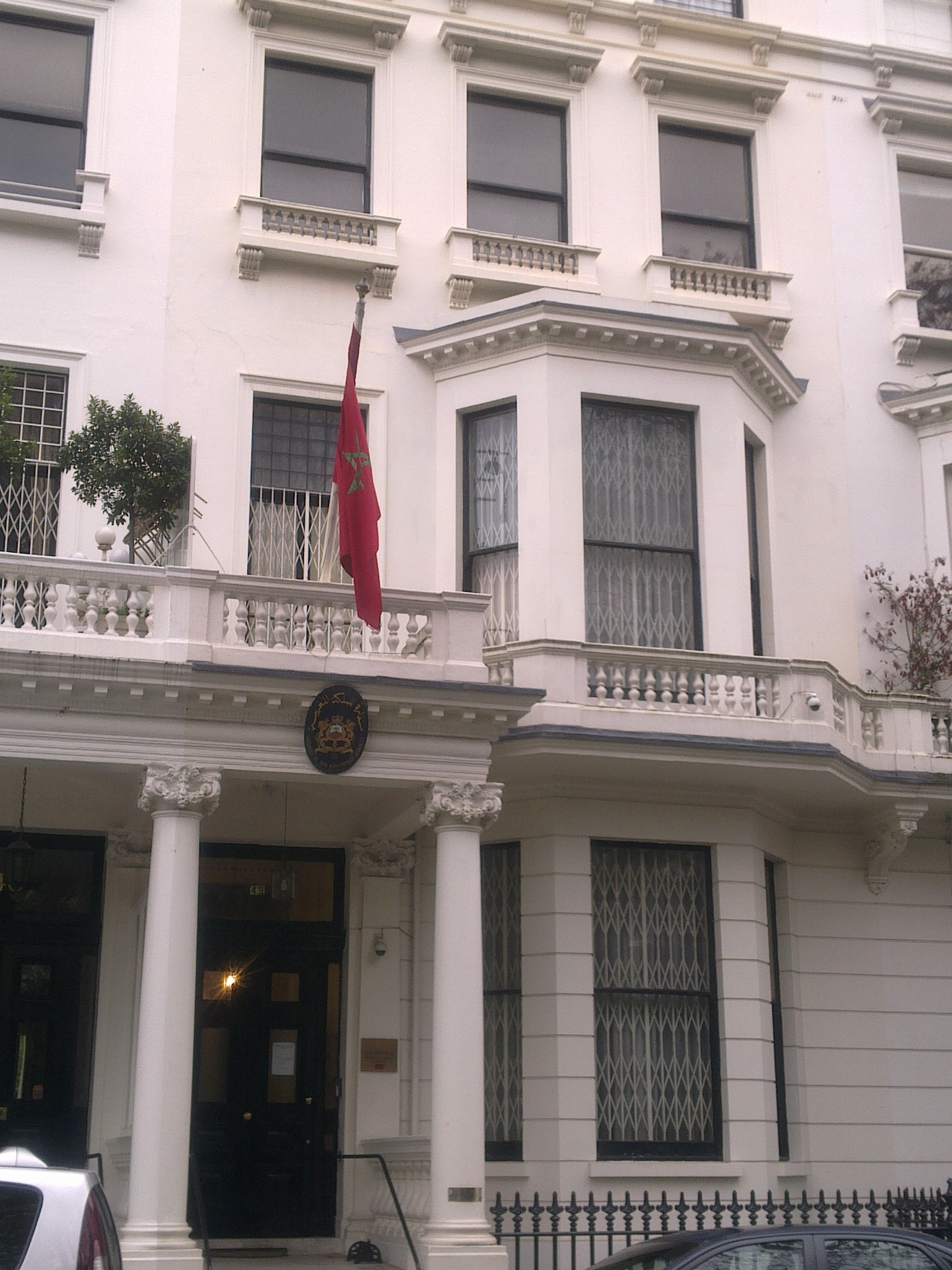
- Incumbent; Hakim Hajoui since July 6, 2020
- Inaugural holder: Rais Merzouk Ahmed Benkacem (Marzuq)
- Formation: 1588

The ambassador of Morocco to the United Kingdom is the highest diplomatic representative of Morocco in the United Kingdom.

== Heads of mission ==
#	Ambassador	Title	Date of appointment	Moroccan monarch	British monarch
1	Rais Merzouk Ahmed Benkacem	Ambassador	1588	Ahmad al-Mansur	Elizabeth I
2	Caid Ahmed Ben Adel	Ambassador	1595	Ahmad al-Mansur	Elizabeth I
3	Abd el-Ouahed ben Messaoud Anoun	Ambassador	1600	Ahmad al-Mansur	Elizabeth I
4	Mohammed Bensaid (known as Lopez de Zapar)	Envoy	1627	Sidi al-Ayachi	Charles I
5	Ahmed Naravaez	Envoy	1627	Sidi al-Ayachi	Charles I
6	Pasha Ahmed Benabdellah	Envoy	1628	Abu Marwan Abd al-Malik II	Charles I
7	Mohammed Clafishou	Envoy	1629	Sidi al-Ayachi	Charles I
8	General Jawdar ben Abdellah	Ambassador	1637	Mohammed esh-Sheikh es-Seghir	Charles I
9	Caid Mohamed Benaskar	Ambassador	1638	Mohammed esh-Sheikh es-Seghir	Charles I
10	Robert Blake	Envoy	1639	Mohammed esh-Sheikh es-Seghir	Charles I
11	Abdelkrim Annaksis	Envoy	1657	Mohamed El Haj Dilai	Charles II
12	Mohammed Ben Haddu Attar	Ambassador	1681	Ismail	Charles II
13	Abdallah ben Aisha	Ambassador	1685	Ismail	Charles II
14	Haim Toladano	Ambassador	1691	Ismail	William III & Mary II
15	Mohamed Cardenas	Envoy	1700	Ismail	William III
16	Haj Ali Saban	Envoy	1700	Ismail	William III
17	Joseph Diaz	Ambassador	1700	Ismail	Anne
18	Ahmed ben Ahmed Cardenas	Ambassador	1706	Ismail	Anne
19	Bentura de Zarl	Envoy	1710	Ismail	Anne
20	Abdelkader Perez	Ambassador	1723	Ismail	George I
21	Mohammed Ben Ali Abgali	Ambassador	1725	Ismail	George I
22	Abdelkader Perez	Ambassador	1737	Mohammed II	George I
23	Abdekader Adiel	Ambassador	1762	Mohammed III	George III
24	Admiral el-Arbi ben Abdellah ben Abu Yahya al-Mestiri	Ambassador	1766	Mohammed III	George III
25	Jacob Benider	Ambassador	1772	Mohammed III	George III
26	Sidi Taher ben Abdelhaq Fennish	Ambassador	1773	Mohammed III	George III
27	Mas'ud de la Mar	Envoy	1781	Mohammed III	George III
28	Meir Macnin	Ambassador	1827	Abderrahmane	George IV
29	al-Amin Said Mohammed ash-Shami	Ambassador	1860	Mohammed IV	Victoria
30	Haj Mohammed Zebdi	Ambassador	1876	Hassan I	Victoria
31	Mohammed Ben Abdellah Ben Abdelkrim as-Saffar	Ambassador	1880	Hassan I	Victoria
32	Prince Moulay Mohammed	Ambassador	1897	Abdelaziz	Victoria
33	al-Mehdi el-Mnebhi	Ambassador	1901	Abdelaziz	Edward VII
34	Pasha Abderrahmane Ben Abdessadek Errifi	Ambassador	1902	Abdelaziz	Edward VII
35	Tahar ben al-Amine	Ambassador	1909	Abdelhafid	Edward VII
36	Prince Moulay Hassan ben Mehdi Alaoui	Ambassador	1957	Mohammed V	Elizabeth II
37	Princess Lalla Aicha	Ambassador	1965	Hassan II	Elizabeth II
38	Mohammed Laghzaoui	Ambassador	1969	Hassan II	Elizabeth II
39	Thami Ouazzani	Ambassador	1971	Hassan II	Elizabeth II
40	Abdallah Chorfi	Ambassador	1973	Hassan II	Elizabeth II
41	Badreddine Senoussi	Ambassador	1976	Hassan II	Elizabeth II
42	Abdellatif Filali	Ambassador	1980	Hassan II	Elizabeth II
43	Mehdi Benabdeljalil	Ambassador	1981	Hassan II	Elizabeth II
44	Abdeslam Zenined	Ambassador	1987	Hassan II	Elizabeth II
45	Khalid Haddaoui	Ambassador	1991	Hassan II	Elizabeth II
46	Mohammed Belmahi	Ambassador	1999	Mohammed VI	Elizabeth II
47	Princess Lalla Joumala Alaoui	Ambassador	2009	Mohammed VI	Elizabeth II
48	Abdesselam Aboudrar	Ambassador	2016	Mohammed VI	Elizabeth II
49	Hakim Hajoui	Ambassador	2020	Mohammed VI	Elizabeth II

=== Gallery ===
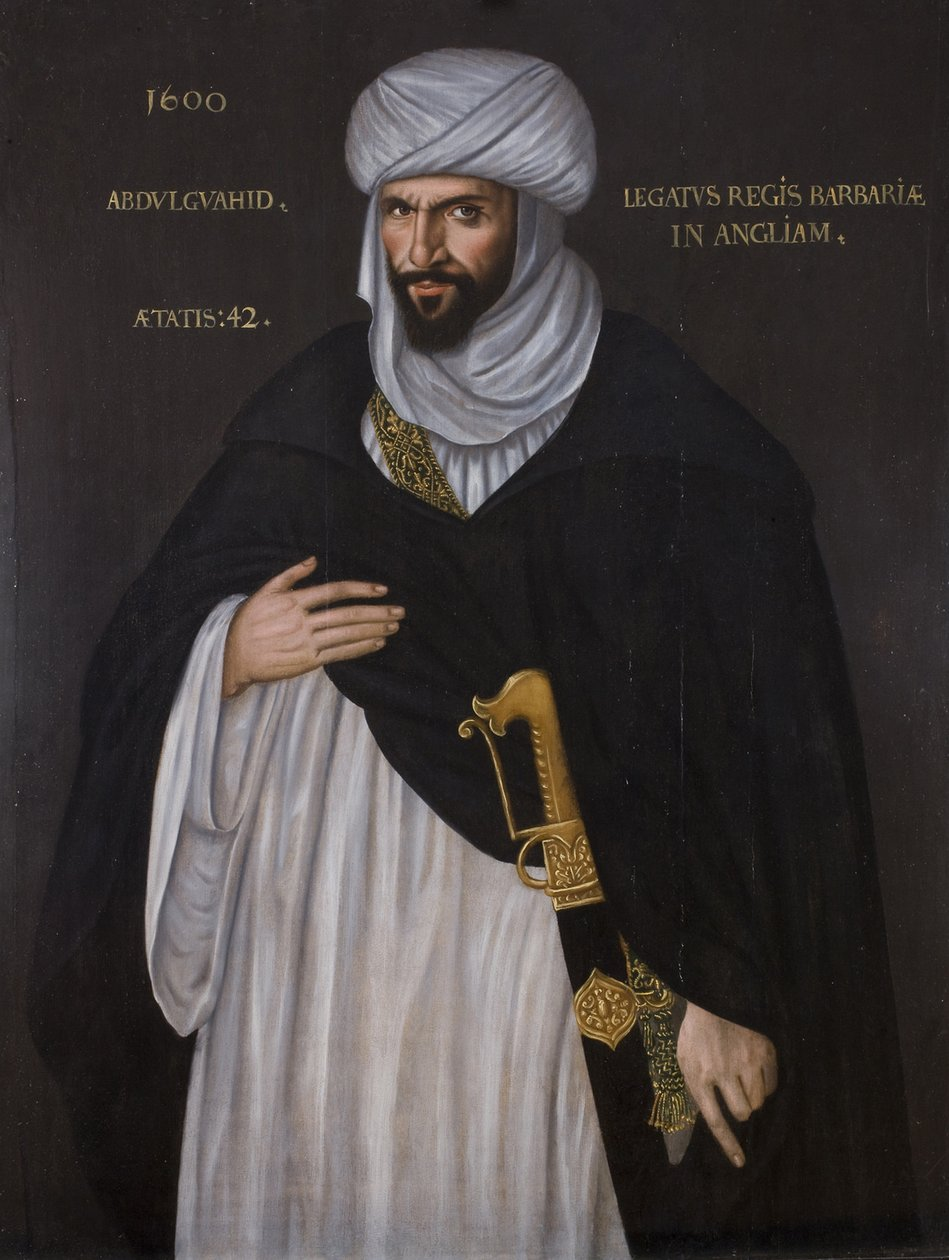
Abd el-Ouahed ben Messaoud Anoun was a possible inspiration of Shakespeare's Othello character

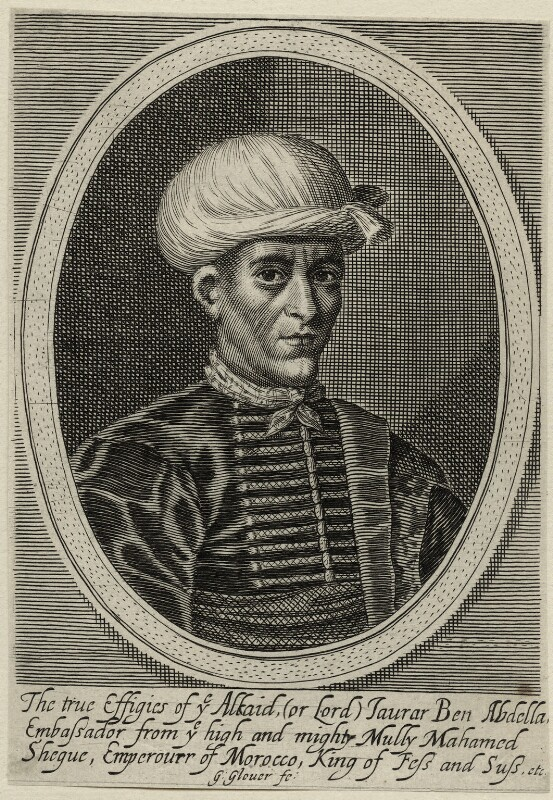
Ambassador Jawdar ben Abdellah, 1637

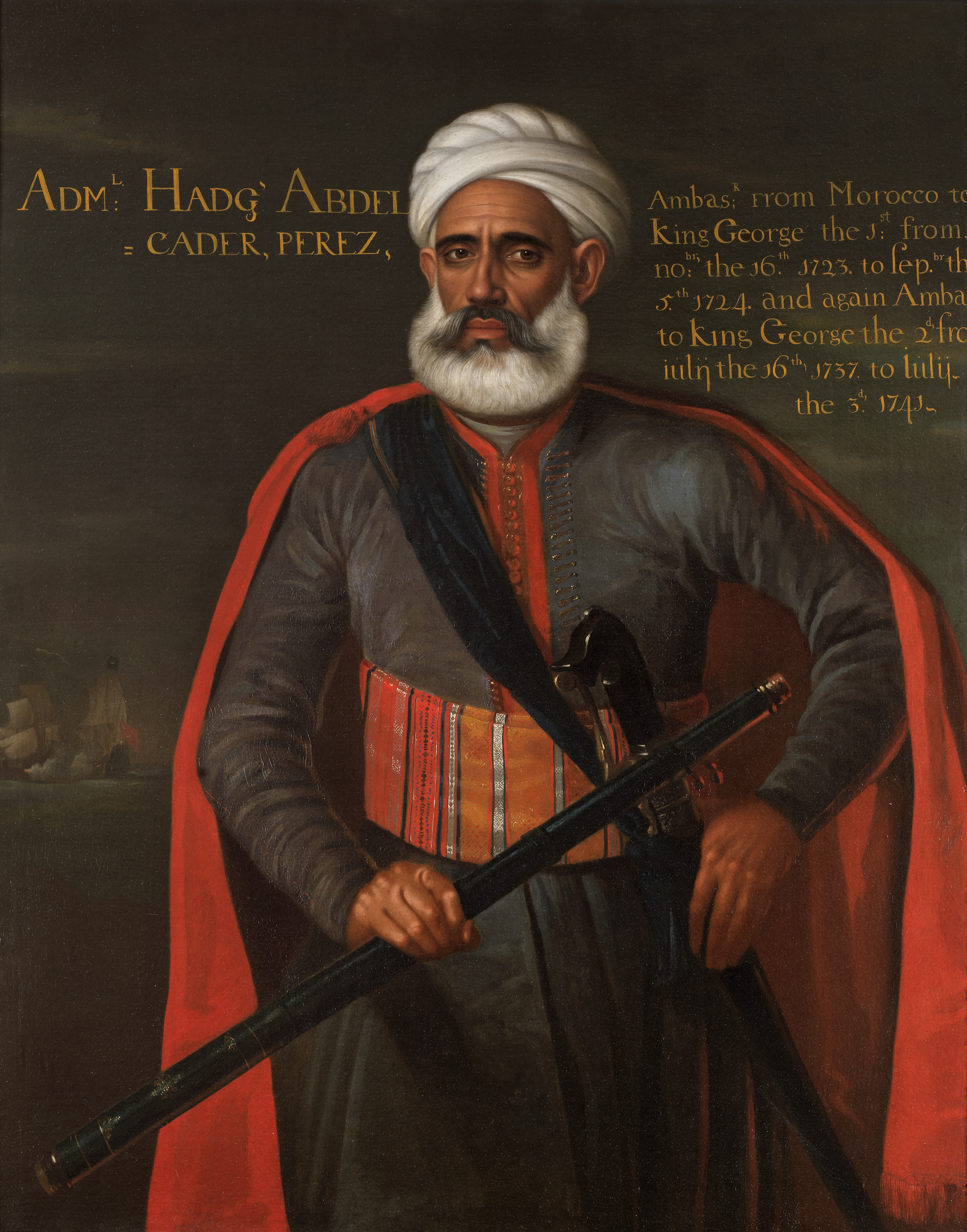
Ambassador Admiral Abdelkader Perez was sent by Ismail Ibn Sharif to England in 1723.

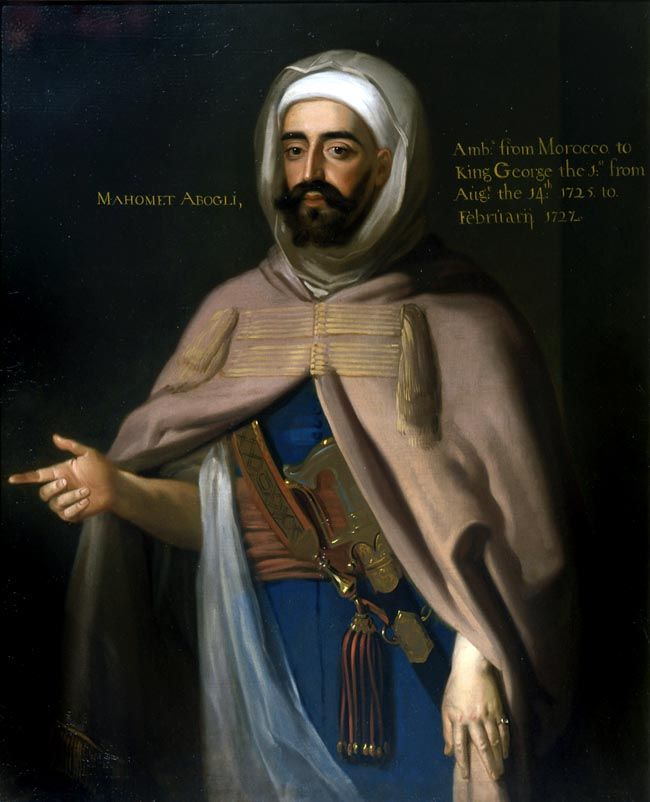
Ambassador Mohammed Ben Ali Abgali, 1725

== See also ==
- Morocco–United Kingdom relations
- List of ambassadors of the United Kingdom to Morocco
- Anglo-Moroccan alliance
- Embassy of Morocco, London
