= Caid Ahmed Ben Adel =

Moroccan diplomat

Caid Ahmed Ben Adel was a Moroccan diplomat.

== Career ==
Sultan Ahmed Al Mansour sent Caid Ahmed Ben Adel to England in 1595 to establish the foundations for the Anglo-Moroccan alliance against Spain. By 1600, the alliance was formalized with the assistance of Moroccan Ambassador Abd el-Ouahed ben Messaoud, Rais Merzouk Ahmed Benkacem, and Caid Ahmed Ben Adel.

Subsequently, Al Mansour appointed Caid Ahmed Ben Adel as Morocco's ambassador to England. In 1595, Ben Adel led a diplomatic mission to England, accompanied by two other caids (corsair leaders) and a delegation of 25 to 30 individuals. Similar to Abdelouahed Anoun, Ben Adel's presence influenced William Shakespeare's work. Gitanjali Shahani posits that the character "the Prince of Morocco" in Shakespeare's play The Merchant of Venice was inspired by Caid Ahmed Ben Adel.
