= Abdelkader Pérez =

Moroccan admiral and ambassador

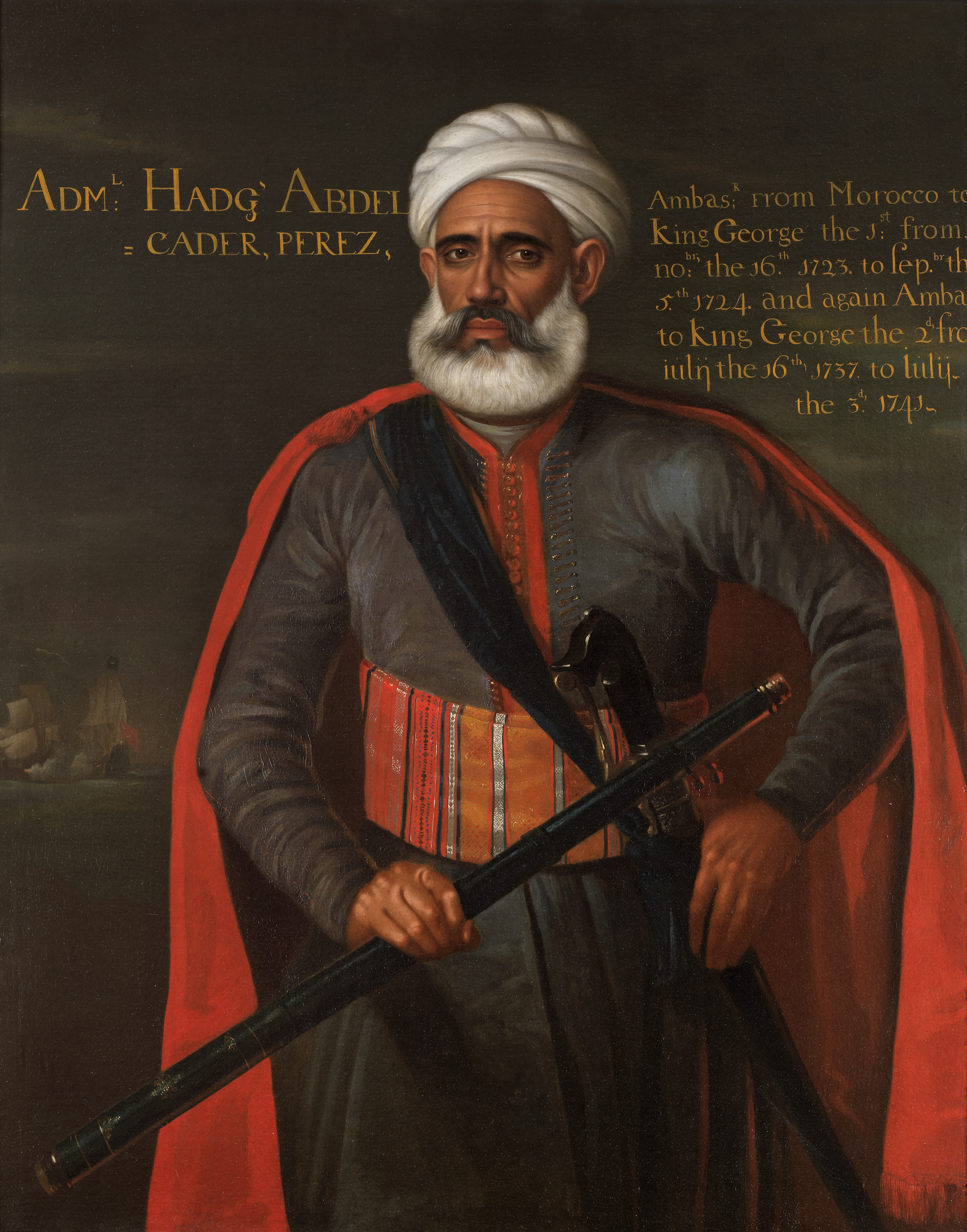
Moroccan Ambassador Admiral Abdelkader Pérez.

Haj Abdelkader Pérez (Arabic: الحاج عبد القادر بيريز) was a Moroccan Admiral and an ambassador to England in 1723 and again in 1737. On 29 August 1724, he met with King George I and the Prince of Wales.

Preceded by Bentura de Zarl (1710)	Ambassador of Morocco to the United Kingdom; 1723-1724; With: King George I & Sultan Moulay Ismail	Succeeded by Mohammed Ben Ali Abgali (1725-1727)

Preceded by Mohammed Ben Ali Abgali (1725-1727)	Ambassador of Morocco to the United Kingdom; 1737-1741; With: King George II & Sultan Mohammed II	Succeeded by Abdelkader Adiel (1762)

== See also ==
- Abd el-Ouahed ben Messaoud
- Mohammed Ben Ali Abgali
- Mohammed ben Hadou
- Anglo-Moroccan alliance
