= Tujjar as-Sultan =

Elite group of official Jewish merchants in Morocco

Tujjār as-Sultān (Arabic: تجّار السلطان, lit. "Merchants of the Sultan") were an elite group of official Jewish merchants in the service of the sultan of Morocco, responsible for much of the kingdom's long-distance trade. The institution of Tujjār as-Sultān was established in the Saadi period (1510–1659). Men such as Joseph Toledano, Meʾir Maqnīn, and Samuel Pallache also served the Makhzen in diplomatic roles.

== History ==
A 1680 treaty with Holland facilitated by Joseph Toledano under Sultan Ismail (1672–1727) of the 'Alawi dynasty, opened prosperous trade to the benefit of Tujjār as-Sultān and the Makhzen.

There were 20-30 royal merchants in Essaouira in the first half of the 19th century, virtually all of whom were Jewish. The Makhzen gave them tax benefits, provided housing, and protected their commercial interests and property rights. These merchants were of vital importance for their connections with Jewish trade networks in Europe, including in London, Amsterdam, Livorno, Marseilles, and other European ports, as well as with Jewish trade networks in southern Morocco, including in Marrakesh, Tafilalelt, Iligh, Ifrane Atlas-Saghir, and Oued Noun. They also worked with Muslims in the interior of Morocco, establishing business partnerships with them, loaning money to them, hiring them, and entrusting tribal chiefs with ensuring the safe passage of merchants and goods through remote areas in the south.
