= List of ambassadors of Morocco to France =

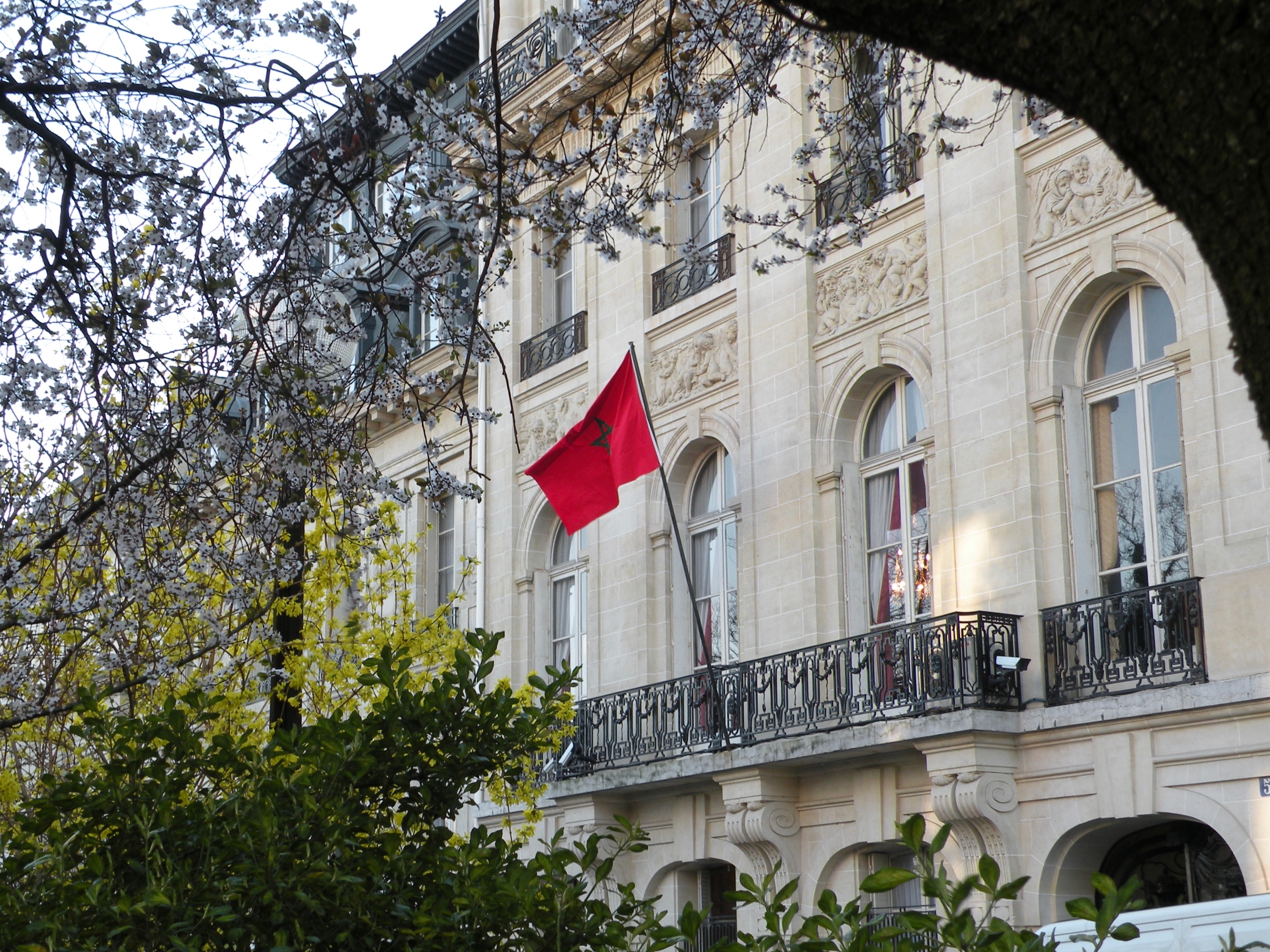
Moroccan Embassy in Paris

The ambassador of Morocco to France is the Kingdom of Morocco's foremost diplomatic representative in the French Republic and head of Morocco's diplomatic mission in France.

== List of ambassadors ==
=== Before the protectorate ===
Name	Start date	End date	Notes
Mohammad Temim	4 January 1682	20 February 1682	Signed a peace treaty with France^{:81}
Mohamed Zebdi	9 June 1876	1876	On a diplomatic mission to France, Belgium, Great Britain and Italy^{:70-72}
Abd-el-Malek ben Ali	3 July 1885	1885	^{:73-74}
El Hajj El Maati	21 September 1889	10 October 1889	^{:74-76}
Mohamed ben Moussa	May 1897	June 1897	Brother of grand vizier Ahmed ben Moussa^{:76-77}
Abd el-Qrim Ben Sliman	June 1901	July 1901	^{:80-81}
Abdellah El Fassi	May 1909	15 July 1910	
El Hajj Mohammed el-Mokri	May 1909	1911	^{:78-79}

=== Since 1956 ===
Name	Start date	End date	Notes
Abderrahim Bouabid	19 June 1956	1957	
Mohamed Zeghari	1957	1 December 1958	
Abdellatif Benjelloun	1 July 1959	3 June 1960	
Mohamed Cherkaoui	2 June 1961	1 December 1964	
Moulay Ali Alaoui	1 December 1964	3 January 1970	
Abdessadek El Glaoui	3 January 1970	7 February 1971	
Mohamed Laghzaoui	7 February 1971	12 December 1972	
Youssef Bel Abbes	12 December 1972	18 September 1990	
Abbas al-Fassi	18 September 199	27 September 1994	
Mohamed Berrada	27 September 1994	September 1999	
Hassan Abouyoub	1 September 1999	30 November 2004	
Fathallah Sijilmassi	7 December 2004	21 January 2009	
El Mostapha Sahel	21 January 2009	5 October 2011	
Chakib Benmoussa	9 March 2013	7 October 2021	
Mohamed Benchaaboun	14 December 2021	19 January 2023	
Samira Sitail	19 October 2023 (appointed)		
