= John Windus =

John Windus (fl. 1725) was a British ambassador to Morocco who wrote a popular and influential account of his travels in that country in 1725. In 1720, he accompanied a diplomatic expedition to Morocco with Commodore Charles Stewart, who was given a small naval squadron and the authority of a minister plenipotentiary. They sailed from England on 24 September 1720 and travelled to Tetuan, where they met the Basha Hamet Ben Ali Ben Abdallah. The two sides agreed a peace treaty which was signed at Ceuta in January 1721, under which the Moroccans undertook to prohibit piracy and release English captives. They travelled on to Meknes where they met the King of Morocco, Ismail Ibn Sharif, and reconfirmed the Anglo-Moroccan alliance.

Windus spent at least seven months (if he signed the treaty in January 1721, he was in the country until August, when he left with the captive English Captains and Sailors released by the treaty, according to his book) travelling in Morocco and drew on his experiences to write A Journey to Mequinez, the Residence of the Present Emperor of Fez and Morocco, on the Occasion of Commodore Stewart’s Ambassy Thither for the Redemption of the British Captives in the Year 1721, published in 1725. The book was only the second published in English on the subject of Morocco and was by far the most comprehensive account of life, society, politics and the environment of a country which few Christians had at that time visited. It went through multiple editions and influenced subsequent writers, as well as providing an invaluable historical record of Morocco at that time. It was translated into German in 1726 and into Arabic in 1993.
