= Mohammed Ben Ali Abgali =

Moroccan diplomat

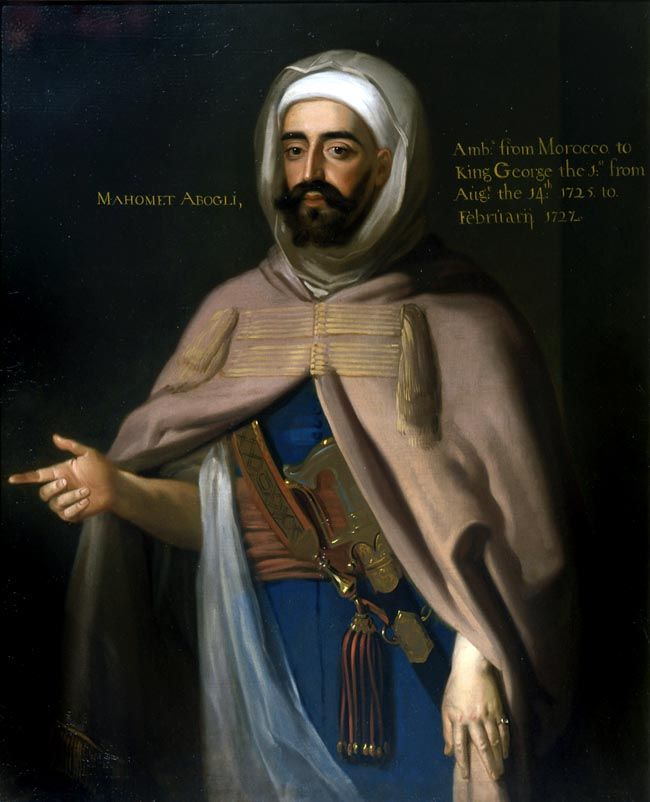
Portrait of Mohammed Ben Ali Abgali in 1725

Mohammed Ben Ali Abgali FRS (Arabic: محمد بن علي أبغالي) was a Moroccan Ambassador to Great Britain, from 14 August 1725 to February 1727.

He was elected Fellow of the Royal Society in 1726. He corresponded with Martin Folkes.

== Career ==
In the 1720s, Mohammed Ben Ali Abgali served as Ismail Ibn Sharif's final ambassador to England. Appointed by the Alaouite emperor, Abgali traveled to London to engage with King George I. During his time in England, he attended various arts events, including a play by Nicholas Rowe and performances featuring Commedia dell'arte, a theatrical form that originated in Italy and gained popularity across Europe from the 16th to 18th centuries.

Abgali's stay allowed him to interact with notable figures and experience the cultural and artistic aspects of London and Europe. English artist, Enoch Seeman, painted a portrait of the Moroccan diplomat, which remains preserved in England. This 400,000-euro valued artwork, depicting Abgali in traditional attire, has been displayed on multiple occasions in the United Kingdom, and is said to have two versions. On February 14, 1727, Abgali returned to his country, Morocco.

| Preceded by Abdelkader Pérez (1723-1724) | Ambassador of Morocco to the United Kingdom; 1725-1727; With: King George I & Sultan Moulay Ismail | Succeeded by Abdelkader Pérez (1737-1741) |
