= Anglo-Moroccan alliance =

Alliance between England and Morocco

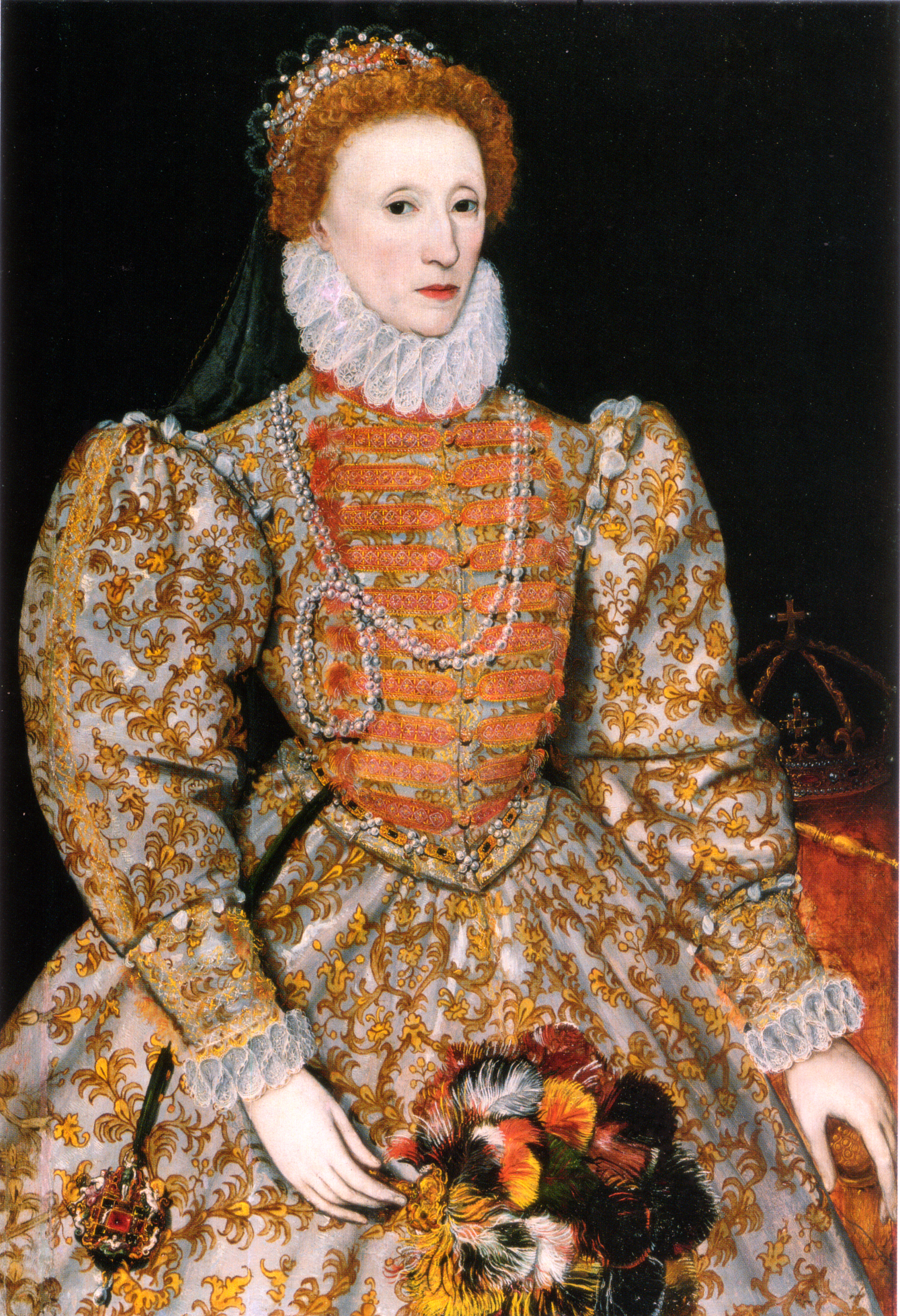
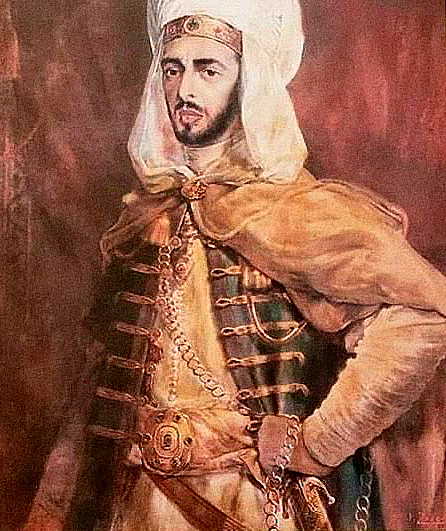
Left image: Queen Elizabeth I of England.
Right image: Sultan Ahmad al-Mansur of Morocco.

The Anglo-Moroccan alliance was established at the end of the 16th century and the early 17th century between the kingdoms of England and Morocco. Commercial agreements had been reached by Queen Elizabeth I of England and the Moroccan Sultan Ahmad al-Mansur on the basis of a common enmity to Philip II of Spain. The arms trade dominated the exchange, and numerous attempts at direct military collaboration were also made.

The alliance was maintained for some time by their successors.

== Background ==
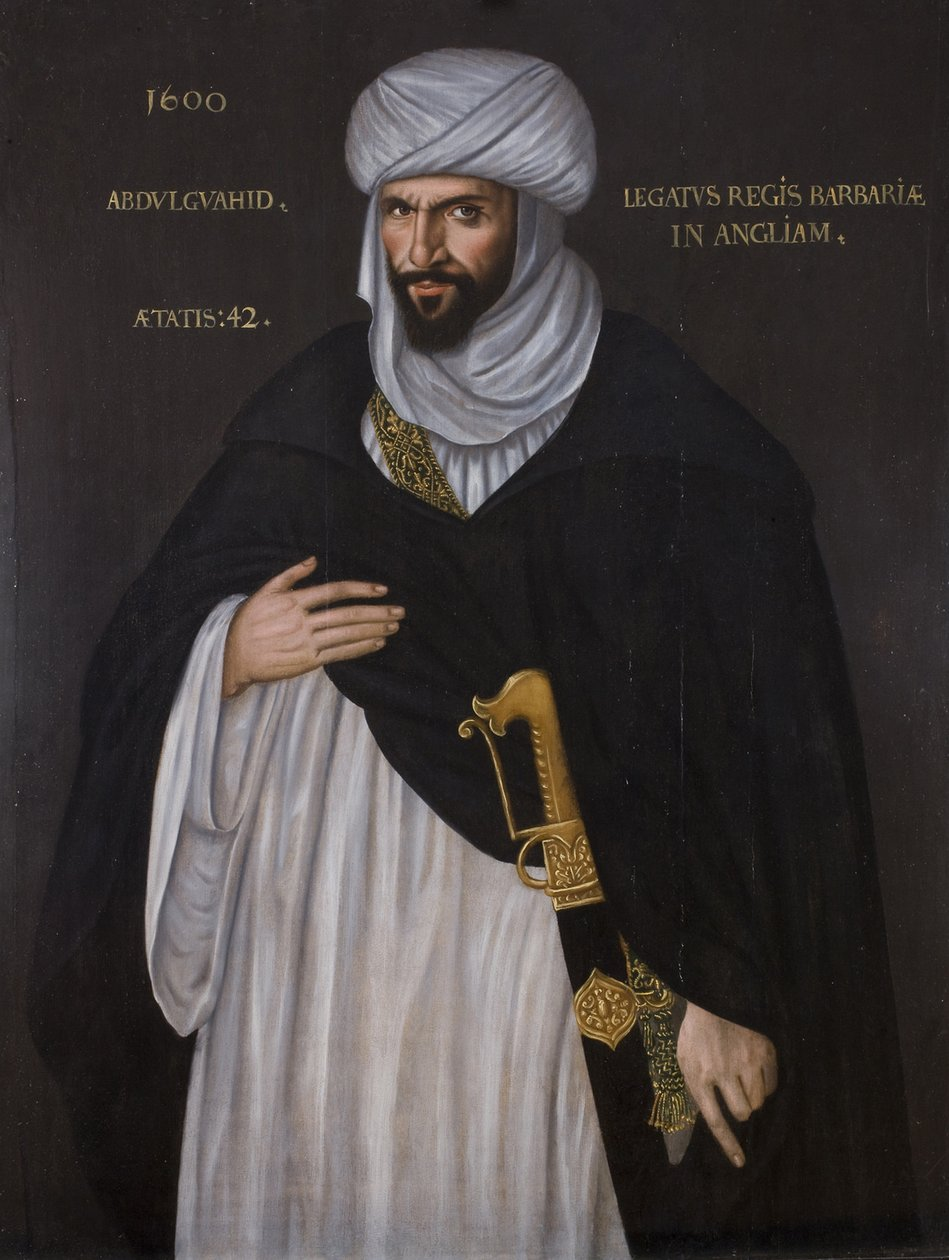
Moroccan ambassador to Elizabeth, Abd el-Ouahed ben Messaoud, in 1600.

The alliance between the two states developed during the 16th century on the back of regular commercial exchanges, largely thanks to the work of the Amphlett family of merchants. European trade with Morocco had been at the command of Spain, Portugal and the Republic of Genoa, but in 1541 the Portuguese suffered the loss of Safi and Agadir, loosening their grip on the area.

Following the sailing of The Lion of Thomas Wyndham in 1551, and the 1585 establishment of the English Barbary Company, trade developed between England and the Barbary states, and especially Morocco.

Sugar, ostrich feathers and saltpeter from Morocco were typically exchanged for English fabrics and firearms, in spite of the protests of Spain and Portugal.

Elizabeth I had numerous exchanges with Sultan Abd al-Malik to facilitate trade and obtain advantages for English traders. The sultan could speak Spanish and Italian as well as Arabic. In 1577 he wrote to the queen in Spanish, signing himself AbdelMeleck in Latin script. That same year, the queen sent Edmund Hogan as ambassador to the Moroccan court.

== Alliance ==
Elizabeth was initially reluctant to develop an arms trade with Morocco, for fear of criticism by other Christian powers, as was communicated by Hogan to the Sultan in 1577. Contacts however soon developed into a political alliance as a result of further diplomatic exchanges between Elizabeth I and Sultan Ahmad al-Mansur, after the defeat of Portugal at the Battle of Alcácer Quibir in 1578.

=== Anglo–Spanish War ===
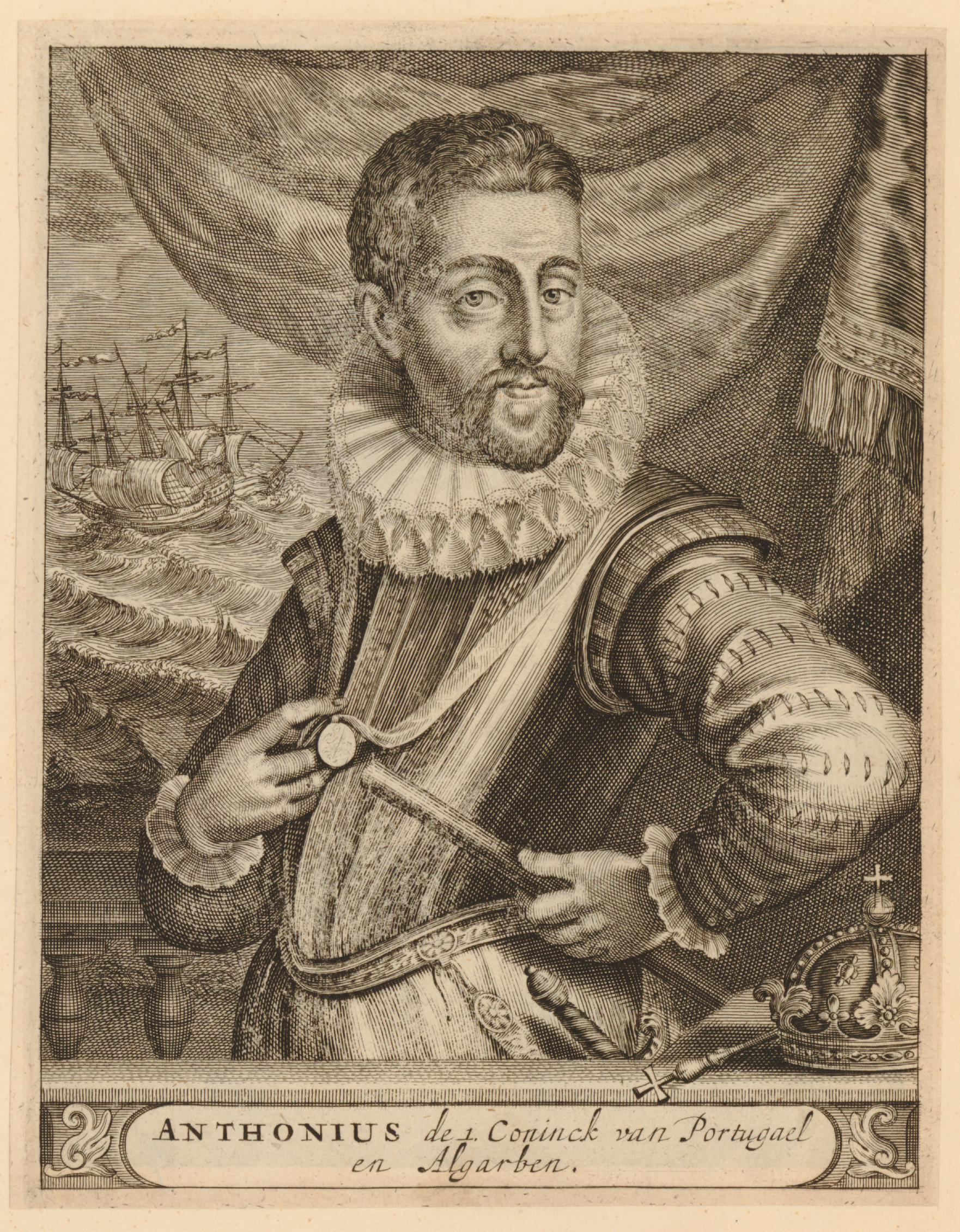
Elizabeth I tried to obtain Sultan al-Mansur's help in backing Dom António's claim to the Portuguese throne against Philip of Spain.

Relations intensified with the acclamation of Philip II of Spain as King of Portugal in 1580, and the advent of the Anglo–Spanish War in 1585. In 1581, Elizabeth authorized the exportation of naval-grade timber to Morocco in exchange for saltpeter, a necessary ingredient in gunpowder. The establishment of the Barbary Company in 1585 further gave England a monopoly on Morocco trade for 12 years. In 1585–1588, through the embassy of Henry Roberts, Elizabeth tried to obtain the Sultan's help in backing Dom António. In 1588, Al-Mansur granted special privileges to English traders.

In her letters to Al-Mansur, Elizabeth, over a period of 25 years, continually described the relationship between the two countries as "La buena amistad y confederación que hay entre nuestras coronas" ("The great friendship and cooperation that exists between our Crowns"), and presented herself as "Vuestra hermana y pariente según ley de corona y ceptro" ("Your sister and relative according to the law of the Crown and the Scepter").

In January 1589, Al-Mansur through his ambassador to the Queen, Marzuq Rais (Mushac Reyz), requested the supply of oars, carpenters and shipwrights, as well as transportation on English ships, in exchange for his contribution of 150,000 ducats and his military help for an Anglo-Moroccan expedition against Spain in favour of the Portuguese claimant. He also requested English military assistance in case of a conflict with neighbouring non-Christian countries. Elizabeth could not meet these demands completely, especially the transportation of Moroccan forces, and negotiation drew on until the death of Dom António in 1595.

The 1589 English expedition to Portugal moved ahead nonetheless, and ended in failure with the English fleet hoping in vain for reinforcements from England or Morocco. Only the Moroccan ambassador Marzuq Rais was accompanying the expedition, on board the flagship of Dom António, disguised as a Portuguese nobleman, and stayed until summer 1589.

=== 1600 embassy ===
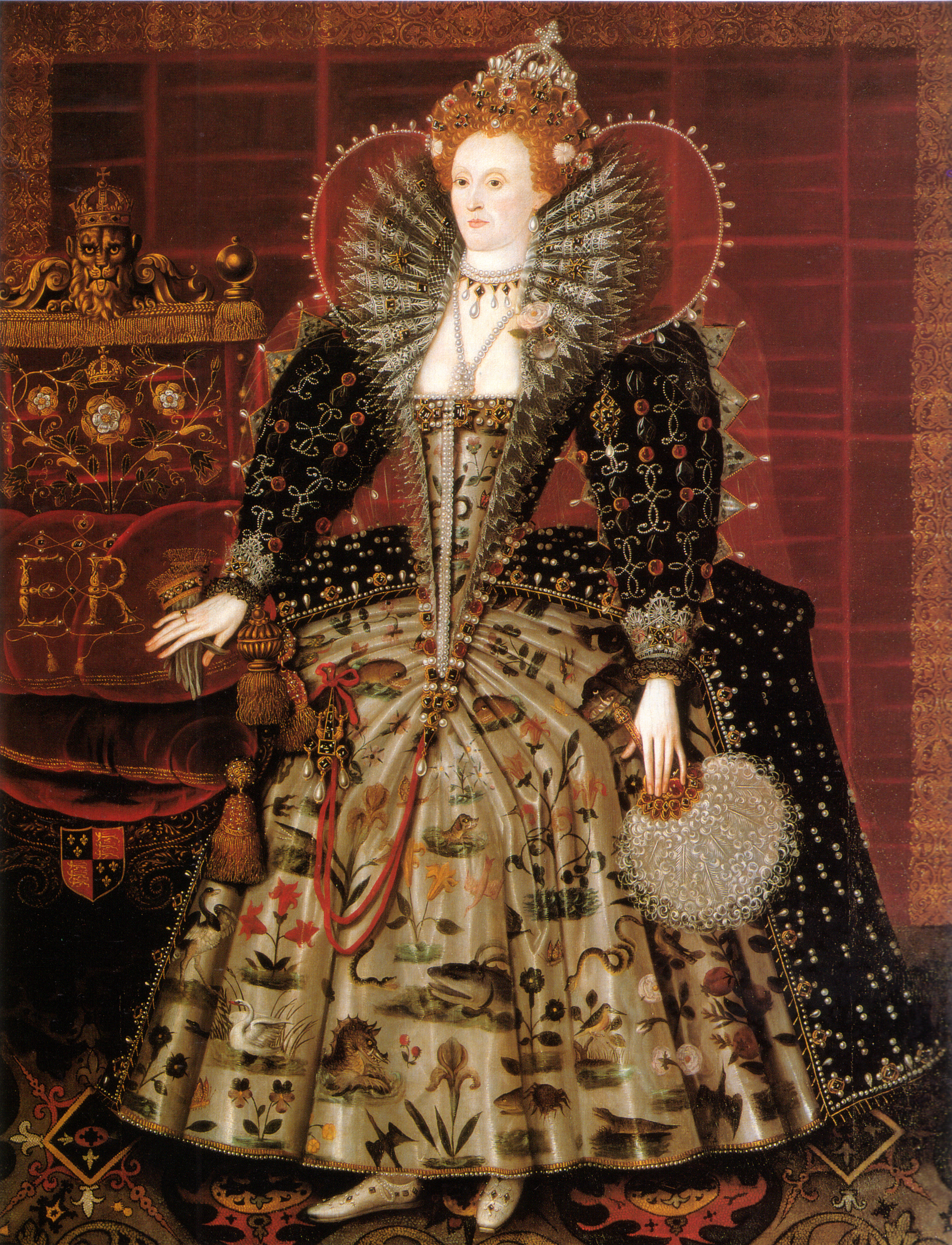
Elizabeth I of England c.1599, standing on an Oriental carpet. Studio of Nicholas Hilliard.

Diplomatic relations continued to intensify between Elizabeth and the Barbary states. England entered in a trading relationship with Morocco detrimental to Spain, selling armour, ammunition, timber, metal in exchange for Moroccan sugar, in spite of a Papal ban, prompting the Papal Nuncio in Spain to say of Elizabeth: "there is no evil that is not devised by that woman, who, it is perfectly plain, succoured Mulocco (Abd-el-Malek) with arms, and especially with artillery".

In 1600, Abd el-Ouahed ben Messaoud, the principal secretary to the Moroccan ruler Mulai Ahmad al-Mansur, visited England as an ambassador to the court of Queen Elizabeth I. Abd el-Ouahed ben Messaoud spent 6 months at the court of Elizabeth, in order to negotiate an alliance against Spain. The Moroccan ruler wanted the help of an English fleet to invade Spain, Elizabeth refused, but welcomed the embassy as a sign of insurance, and instead accepted to establish commercial agreements. Queen Elizabeth and king Ahmad continued to discuss various plans for combined military operations, with Elizabeth requesting a payment of 100,000 pounds in advance to king Ahmad for the supply of a fleet, and Ahmad asking for a tall ship to be sent to get the money. Elizabeth "agreed to sell munitions supplies to Morocco, and she and Mulai Ahmad al-Mansur talked on and off about mounting a joint operation against the Spanish". Discussions however remained inconclusive, and both rulers died within two years of the embassy.

=== James I and Charles I ===
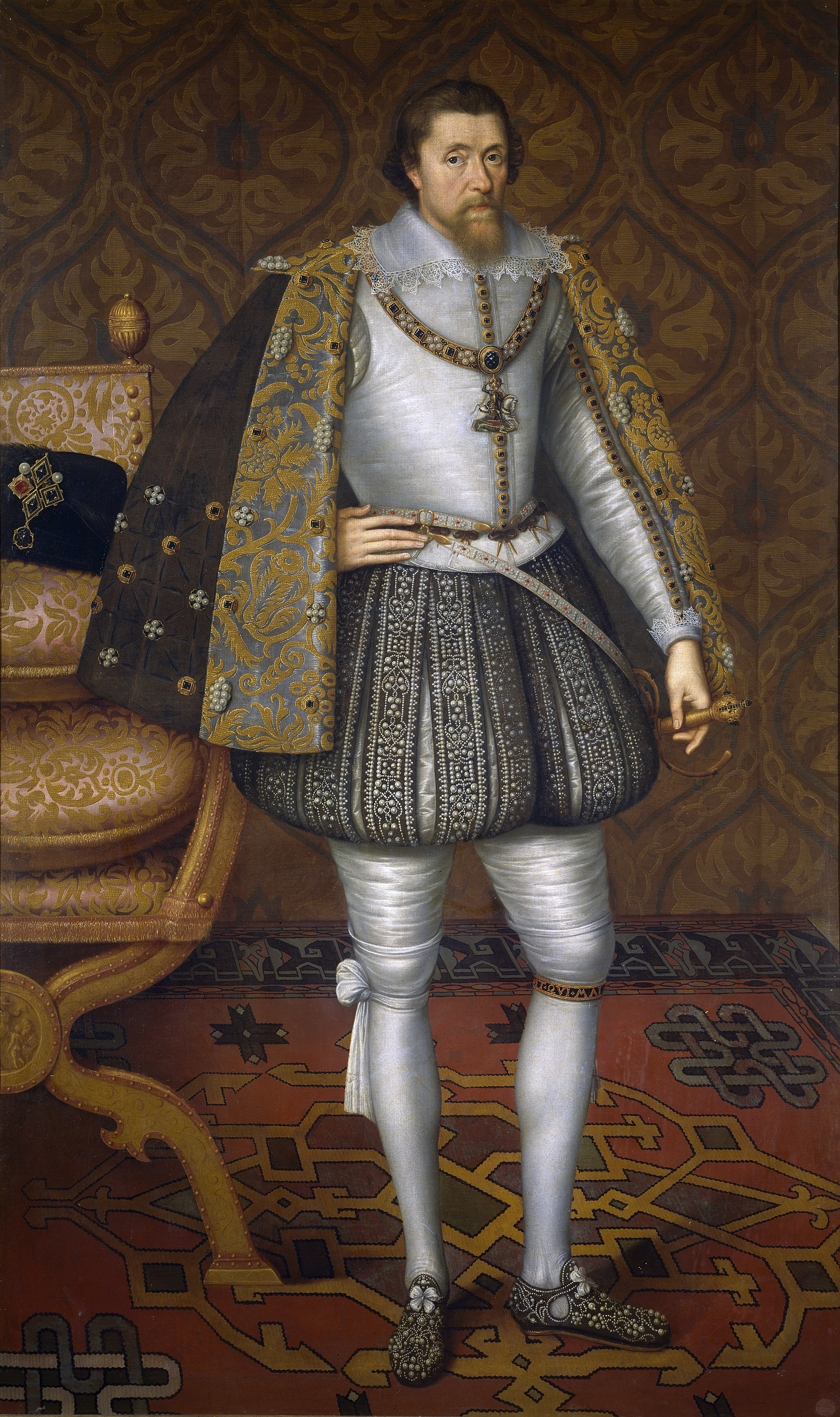
James I of England from the period 1603–1613, standing on an Oriental carpet, by Paul van Somer I (1576–1621).

Morocco had been falling into a state of anarchy following the death of Ahmed al-Mansur in 1603, and local warlords had been on the rise, making the alliance with the Sultanate less and less meaningful. James I also made peace with Spain upon his accession in 1603, with the Treaty of London. Relations continued under James I however, who sent his ambassador John Harrisson to Muley Zaydan in 1610 and again in 1613 and 1615 in order to obtain the release of English captives in Morocco. English privateers such as Jack Ward continued to prosper in collaboration with the Barbary states, including Morocco.

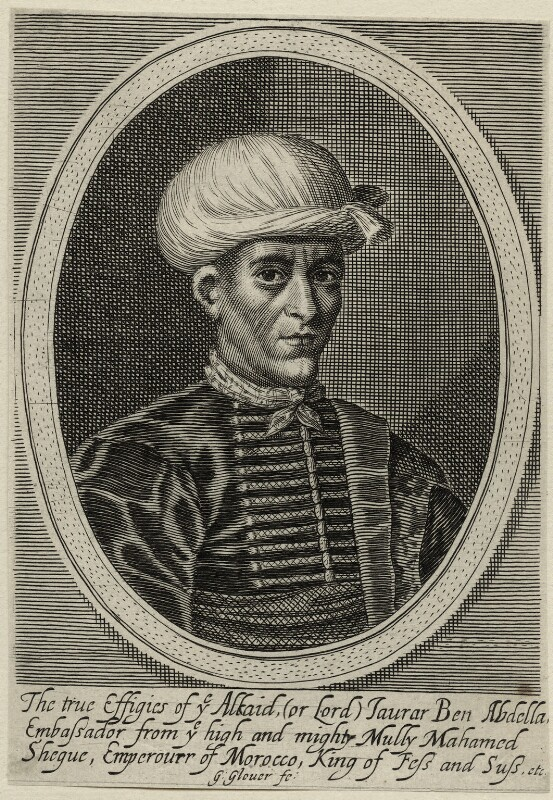
Moroccan ambassador Jawdar ben Abdellah, 1637.

During the Thirty Years' War under the rule of Charles I, England sought Moroccan military help against Spain in Tetouan and Salé. England had hoped to obtain Moroccan cooperation after the 1625 English attack on Cádiz, but the campaign proved disastrous and ruined the prestige of England.

On 10 May 1627, England passed an agreement with one of these local warlords, the Mujahidin leader Sidi Al-Ayyashi to obtain his help in releasing English captives, in exchanges for the supply of provisions and arms. England and Al-Ayyashi collaborated for a period of about 10 years, as in the attempted coordinated liberation of Al Ma'mura.

In 1632, the city of Salé, a major harbour to piracy, was jointly taken by an English squadron and Moroccan forces, permitting the pacification of the city and the release of Christian prisoners.

On May 13, 1637, a Convention was signed between Charles I and Sidi Mohammed el-Ayachi, master of Salé, allowing for the supply of military armament to the Sultan.

=== Embassies of Mulay Ismail ===
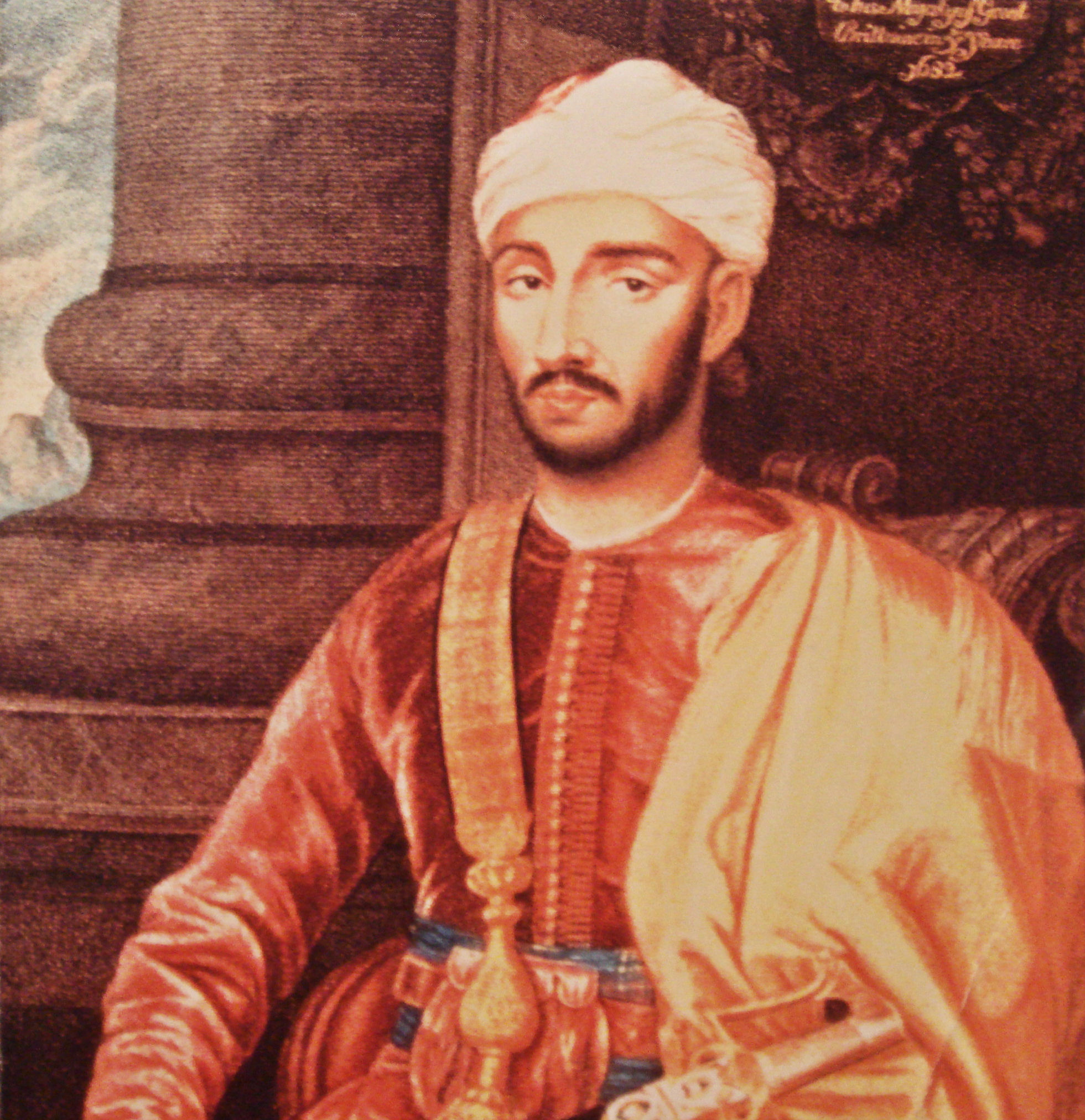
Mohammed bin Hadou, Mulay Ismail's Moroccan ambassador to England in 1682.

Relations continued under the Moroccan ruler Mulay Ismail. In 1682, he sent Mohammed bin Hadou as Moroccan ambassador sent to the English court of Charles II. Mohammed spent six months in England, in a highly commented visit. He visited Oxford, Cambridge and the Royal Society among many other places. These exchanges forty years of shifting alliances between England and Morocco, related to European conflicts, trade issues, Barbary Coast pirates and the exchange of captives.

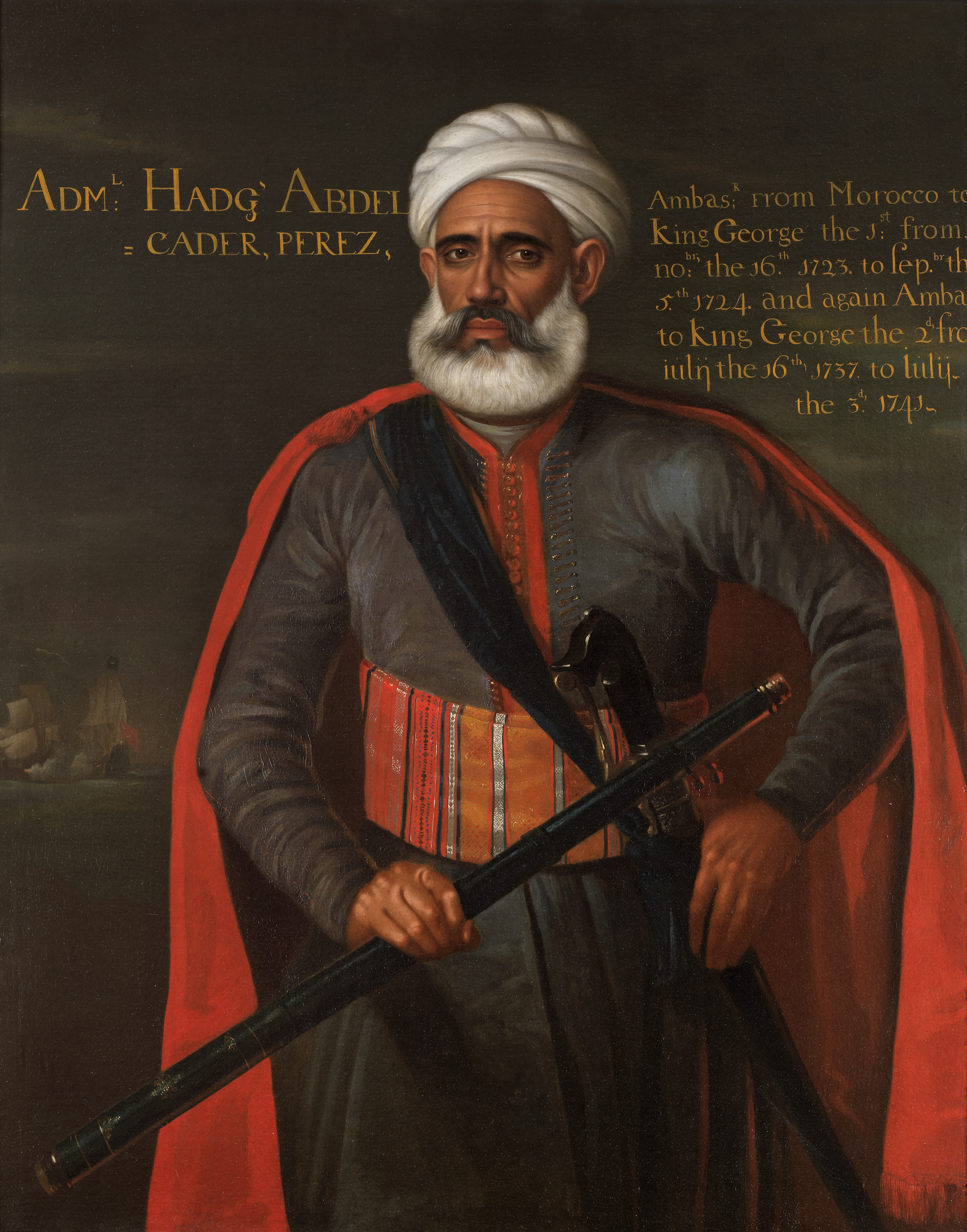
Ambassador Admiral Abdelkader Perez, 1723–1737.

One of the high points of these contacts occurred in 1720–21, when English ambassadors John Windus and Commodore Hon. Charles Stewart visited Morocco. They succeeded in signing a diplomatic treaty with Morocco for the first time, and returned home with 296 released British slaves. Moroccan ambassadors were again sent to England in 1726 ("Mahomet" and "Bo-ally"), and in 1727 a new treaty was signed by John Russel with Mulay Ismail's successor. A further treaty was signed by John Drummond-Hay in 1865.

== Impact on literature ==
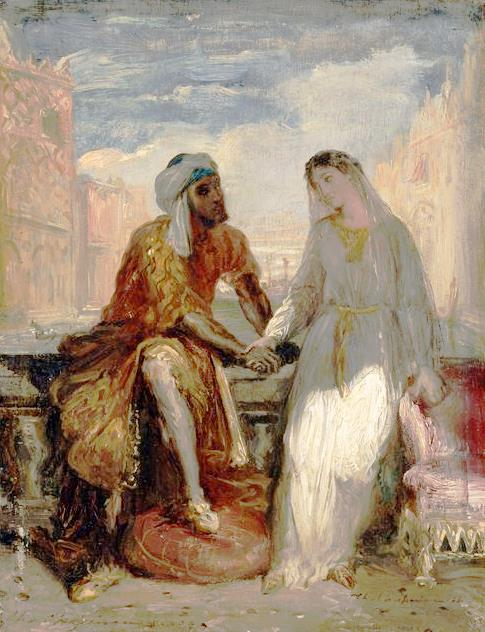
Othello and Desdemona in Venice by Théodore Chassériau, 1850. Shakespeare's Othello and Desdemona in Venice

These intense relations between England and Morocco are thought to have had a direct impact on the literary productions of the age in England, especially the works of Shakespeare, or The Battle of Alcazar by George Peele.

These contacts possibly influenced the creation of the characters of Shylock, or the Prince of Morocco in The Merchant of Venice. It has even been suggested that the figure of Abd el-Ouahed ben Messaoud may have inspired the character of Shakespeare's Moorish hero Othello.

== See also ==
- Morocco–United Kingdom relations
- List of Ambassadors of Morocco to the United Kingdom
- Islam and Protestantism
- Islam in England
