= Meir Macnin =

Meir Ben Abraham Cohen, commonly known as Meir Maqnin or Macnin (c.1760–1835) was a Moroccan diplomat.

== Name ==
The nickname Maqnin (Arabic: مقنين 'goldfinch') was initially given to Meir Ben Abraham Cohen's father. Meir and his brothers were known as ulād Maqnin (أولاد مقنين 'the sons of Maqnin').

== Biography ==
Maqnin was born in 1760 in Marrakesh to a Jewish family from Essaouira. He is known for establishing Essaouira as Morocco's principal trading post.

By the 1780s, Maqnin forged connections with Essaouira's governor, and together with his brother, expanded their business. However, in 1799, following a devastating plague in the city, Maqnin left Essaouira and ventured to London aboard the ship Aurora.

Upon settling in England, Maqnin resided near London's commercial district and continued trading through his close contacts with the Moroccan administration. He positioned himself as Morocco's agent in Europe, particularly in England, but this led to some controversy.

Maqnin's financial dealings in England were not without challenges, as he failed to repay numerous British creditors. Despite presenting himself as the official Moroccan representative in London, historical evidence suggests his only contact with the Moroccan sultan occurred in March 1808, when he initiated efforts to obtain a ship for Morocco. For instance, Maqnin acquired a brig cutter armed with twelve brass cannons for Sultan Slimane, which was delivered to Morocco within three months. However, he failed to pay for these goods in London.

In 1827, Maqnin returned to England, alleging a diplomatic mission for the sultan to King George IV's court. Despite arrest threats, he remained in England and resumed his commercial activities.

Maqnin's financial issues persisted, eventually prompting his return to Morocco. His later years were marked by mounting financial problems, and he ultimately died in Marrakesh.
