= Jawdar ben Abdellah =

Moroccan politician and diplomat

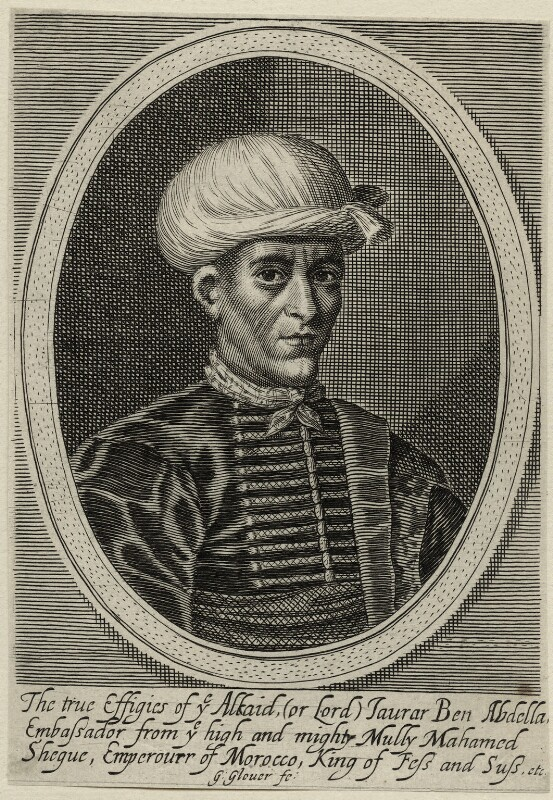
Jawdar ben Abdellah in 1637

Jawdar ben Abdellah was a Moroccan diplomat who served as an ambassador to England, succeeding Abd el-Ouahed ben Messaoud.

== Biography ==
According to an American historian, John Bulter, Jawdar was a military figure of Portuguese descent.

Jawdar was appointed by Mohammed esh-Sheikh es-Seghir. In 1637, he met with King Charles I to secure an agreement supporting the beleaguered dynasty.

Amid internal strife, Mohammed esh-Sheikh es-Seghir relied on Jawdar to persuade King Charles I to aid the struggling sultanate against its adversaries. In England, Jawdar successfully negotiated a treaty with King Charles I, prohibiting English trade with Agadir, Essaouira, and Massa, which were not under Saadi control. In signing the agreement, King Charles I pledged to supply the sultan with battleships as required.
