= Hakim Hajoui =

Moroccan diplomat (born 1983)

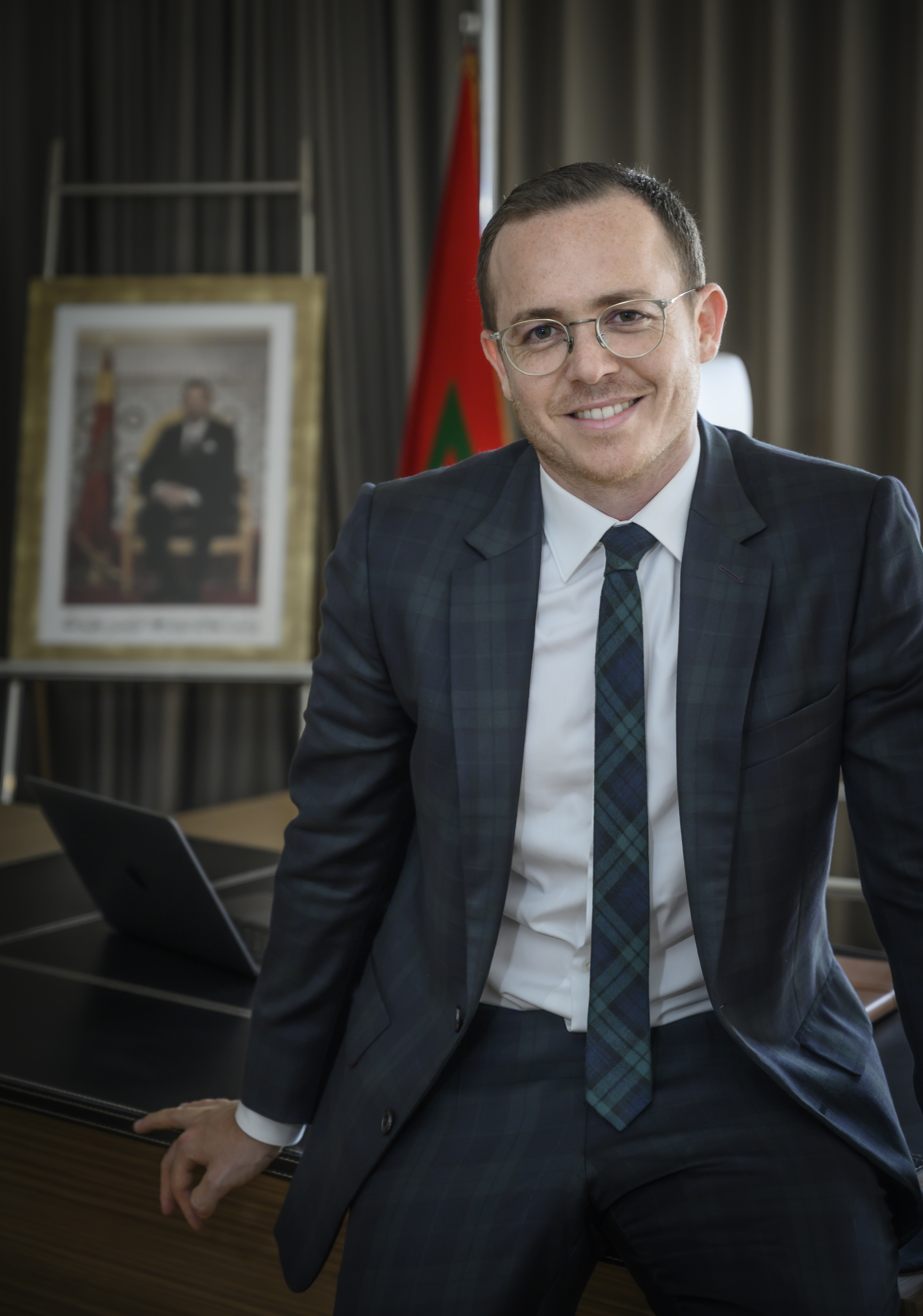
- Official portrait

Ambassador of Morocco to the United Kingdom
- Incumbent
- Assumed office 6 July 2020
- Preceded by: Abdesselam Aboudrar

Personal details
- Born: 10 February 1983 (age 43) Rabat, Morocco
- Children: 3
- Parent: Mohamed Hajoui (father)
- Education: Concordia University; Telecom Paris

Hakim Hajoui (born 10 February 1983) is a Moroccan diplomat. He was appointed ambassador of Morocco to the United Kingdom in 2020.

== Biography ==
=== Education ===
He is a graduate of Concordia University in Montreal, where he gained a Bachelor of Computer Engineering, and Telecom Paris, studying a Master of Science in Networked Computer Systems.

=== Career ===
Hajoui began his career in 2008 in strategy and organizational consulting at Capgemini Consulting in Paris. During his five years there, he worked on the transformation of large industrial and financial companies.

He joined OCP in 2012 as project officer in the Chairman's office, before taking on positions focused on the company's strategy and corporate development. He led OCP's expansion in Africa and oversaw, in particular, the development of South-South cooperation partnerships in several countries such as Côte d'Ivoire, Senegal and Ghana. In 2015, he worked on the creation of the OCP Africa subsidiary and led operations in West Africa before being appointed chief of staff.

Previously, Hakim Hajoui held the position of the OCP Group’s chief of staff for the company's Chairman & CEO Mostafa Terrab from 2016. In this role, he also managed the public affairs of the phosphate mining and fertilizer world leader.

Hakim Hajoui was appointed ambassador of Morocco to the United Kingdom by King Mohammed VI of Morocco on July 6, 2020.

=== Personal life ===
Born in 1983 in Rabat, Hajoui is married and a father of 3 children.
