= Barbary Company =

English trading company in Morocco

Marocco Company
- Industry: International trade
- Founded: 1585
- Founder: Robert Dudley; Ambrose Dudley
- Headquarters: London, England
- Area served: Mediterranean Sea; Atlantic Ocean
- Products: Cloth and sugar
- Services: Trade and commerce

The Marocco Company or Barbary Company was a trading company established by the Queen Elizabeth I of England in 1585 through a patent granted to the Earls of Warwick and Leicester, as well as forty others. When she wrote the patents, Elizabeth emphasized the value of the region's "divers Marchandize... for the use and defence" of England.

The privilege of the company was to benefit from exclusive trade for Morocco for a period of 12 years, until its charter expired in 1597. Queen Elizabeth sent her Minister Roberts to the Moroccan sultan Ahmad al-Mansur to reside in Morocco and obtain advantages for English traders. A treaty signed in 1728 extended these privileges, especially those pertaining to the safe-conduct of English nationals.

== Background and origins ==
The formal beginning of Anglo-Ottoman relations dates back to correspondence between Elizabeth I and the Ottoman Sultan Murad III which led in May 1580 to an agreement between the two rulers that English merchants could pass safely through Ottoman-controlled seas and port in the eastern Mediterranean and the Barbary Coast of North Africa. This essentially granted trading privileges to the English, who for various reasons, mainly piracy, had been unable to trade efficiently in the Mediterranean since the 1550s, and in September 1581, the Turkey Company was established as a joint-stock venture to take advantage of this new monopoly on regional trade.

In 1585, the Barbary Company, separate from the Turkey Company and the Venice Company (1583), who also operated in the Mediterranean and later merged into the Levant Company in 1592, was established with many of the same merchant investors, with a focus on trade along the Atlantic coast of Morocco. Morocco was at that point the main source of sugar for the English market, prior of course to the development of the West Indies plantations in the 1600s.

== The Company ==
Headed by Robert Dudley, 1st Earl of Leicester and Ambrose Dudley, 3rd Earl of Warwick, the Barbary Company achieved little regulation of affairs and was never incorporated, with its first charter expiring in 1597. It was not even formally named as the Barbary Company, a conventional title. Nor was there a provision of a governor or a court of assistants like with most companies at the time. The charter itself was merely a collective licence to two noblemen and around 40 London merchants for exclusive trade with Morocco for 12 years.

The main act of trade the company engaged in was the trade of English cloth for Moroccan sugar, though at its inception, there were complaints from merchants in London that the cloth was being sold excessively cheaply while the sugar was being acquired at expensive rates.

Many of the company's members also ended up trading for the Levant Company due to the close geography and intertwining of interests, the success of the latter probably contributing towards the commercial defeat of the Barbary Company.

== See also ==
- List of trading companies

== Bibliography ==
- George Cawston, Augustus Henry Keane, The Early Chartered Companies (A.D. 1296-1858) The Lawbook Exchange, Ltd., 2001 ISBN 1-58477-196-8
