= Mohamed Zebdi =

Moroccan diplomat

Haj Mohamed Zebdi was a Moroccan diplomat.

== Biography ==
In 1876, Moulay Hassan I appointed Haj Mohamed Zebdi, a former Prefect of Rabat, as Morocco's European ambassador. Zebdi had previously served under Moulay Abdrahmane bin Hisham and held various roles during the Spanish-Moroccan War. His diplomatic mission traversed Italy, France, Belgium, England, with France being the initial and most significant stop due to its potential threat to Morocco.

Zebdi, leading the Moroccan delegation, was welcomed at the Élysée Palace, where he addressed French President Patrice de MacMahon on behalf of the Alaouite Sultan. The French government facilitated Zebdi's travel to Great Britain with a special ship. In London, Zebdi met Queen Victoria and explored ways to safeguard English merchants in Morocco.

After returning briefly to France, Zebdi moved to Italy, meeting King Victor Emmanuel III in Turin on August 22. The ambassador returned to Tangier later that year. He contributed to the 1880 Madrid Agreement, which recognized Morocco as an independent state.
