= Mohammed ben Hadou =

Moroccan diplomat

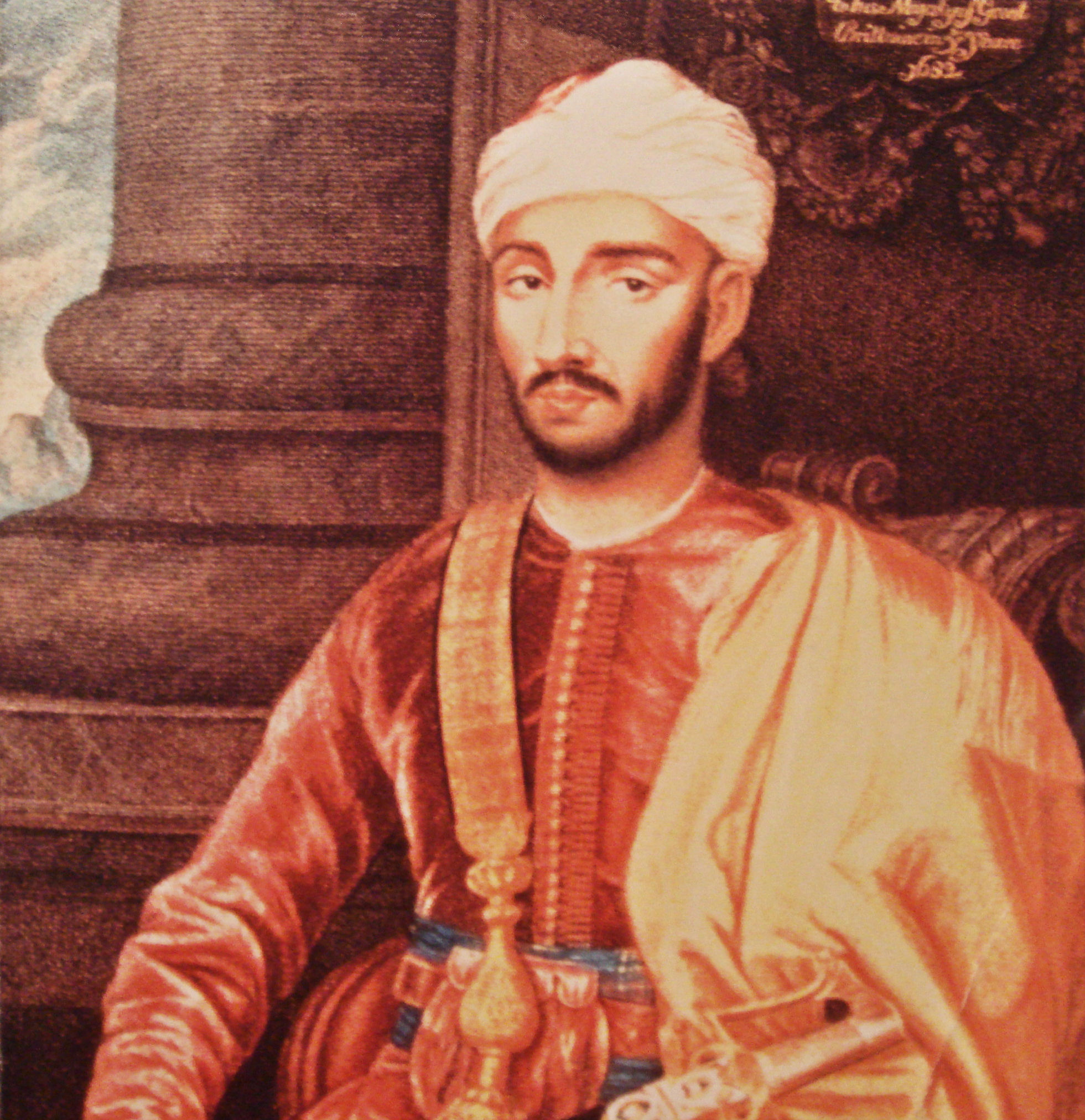
Mohammed bin Hadou, Moroccan ambassador to Great Britain in 1682.

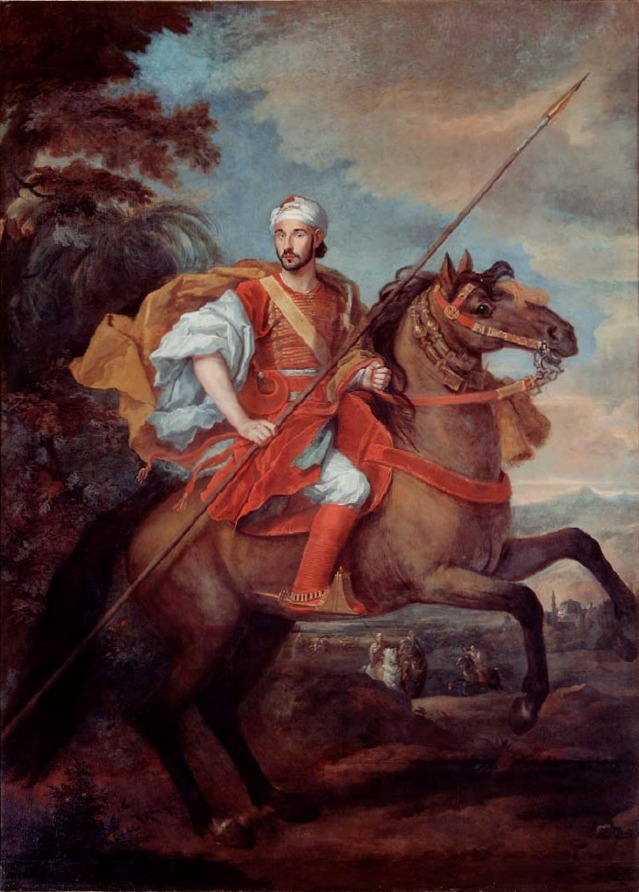
Ambassador Ben Hadou, riding in Hyde Park, 1682.

Mohammed ben Hadou (Arabic: محمد بن حدو أعطار), also Mohammad bin Hadou, Mohammad bin Hadu or Muhammad ben Haddu al'Attar, was a Moroccan ambassador sent to the English court of Charles II by Muley Ismail in 1681–82. According to the contemporary English commentator John Evelyn, he was the son of an English woman.

He arrived in England on 29 December 1681, and left on 23 July 1682. His six-month visit to England was highly commented upon, publicized in the London Gazette and was even the subject of occasional poems. He visited Oxford and Cambridge among many other places and became a Fellow of the Royal Society in April.

John Evelyn recorded that he was "the fashion of the season", and commented on him that he was "a handsome person, well featured and of a wise look, subtile and extremely civile". At the theater the ambassador behaved "with extreme modesty and gravity". He struck a magnificent figure riding in Hyde Park.

Mohammed returned to Morocco with a draft Peace and Trade Treaty which was finally not ratified by his king because of outstanding issues regarding the English military presence in Tangiers and English captives in Morocco. The exchanges started 40 years of a shifting Anglo-Moroccan alliance related to European conflicts, trade issues, Barbary Coast pirates and the exchange of captives.

England Socinians wrote letters for Mohammed bin Hadou to remit to Mulay Ismail, in which they praised God for having "preserved your Emperor and his people in the excellent knowledge of that truth touching your belief in a onely sovereign God, who has no distinct [...] or plurality of persons", and praising "Mahomet" for being "a scourge on those idolizing Christians". However, they also complained that the Qur'an contained contradictions that must have been a consequence of its editing after Mohammed's death.

During his stay Mohammed bin Hadou's interpreter Lucas apparently married an English servant who would accompany the lot back to Morocco. But Lucas ended up stealing some money from Mohammed bin Hadou and ran away. He was caught and cross-examined, after which he was locked up at Newgate prison. But Mohammed bin Hadou forgave him and let him return to Morocco with him

Following Mohammed bin Hadou's return to Morocco he acquired a reputation, in the eyes of the English slaves held there, of being particularly cruel towards them.

Forty years of shifting alliances between the two countries would follow Mohammed's embassy.

== See also ==
- Anglo-Moroccan alliance
- Islam and Protestantism
