= Abd el-Ouahed ben Messaoud =

Moroccan ambassador to England in 1600

Abd al-Wahid bin Mas'ud bin Mohammed Anun
- عبد الواحد بن مسعود بن محمد عنون
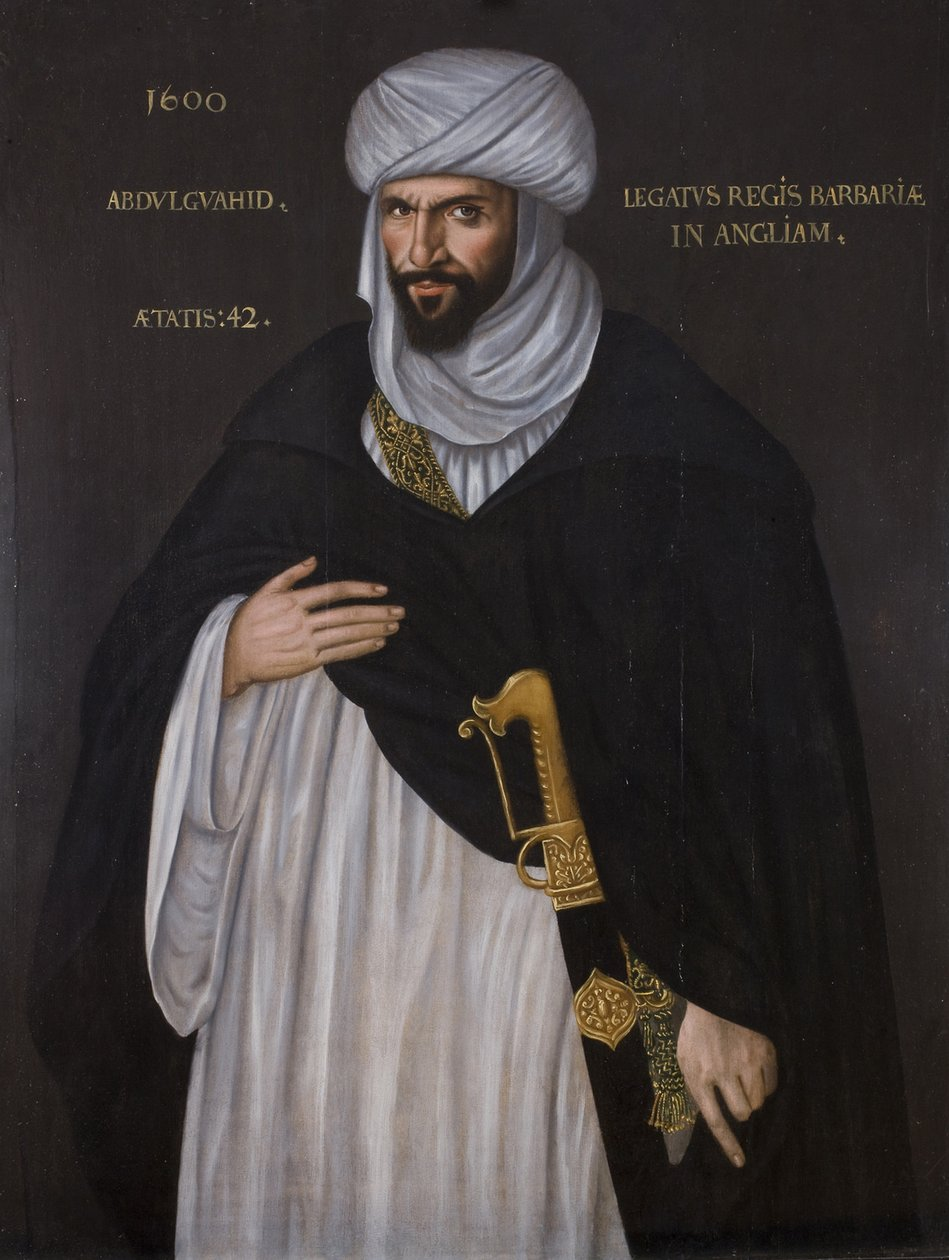
- Portrait, c. 1600
- Known for: Moroccan ambassador to the Court of Queen Elizabeth I in 1600.

Abd al-Wahid bin Mas'ud bin Mohammed Anun (Arabic: عبد الواحد بن مسعود بن محمد عنون) was the principal secretary to the Moroccan Emperor Mulay Ahmad al-Mansur and ambassador to the court of Queen Elizabeth I of England in 1600, whose primary task was to promote the establishment of an Anglo-Moroccan alliance.

== Career ==
The visit of Abd al-Wahid bin Mas'ud followed the sailing of The Lion in 1551, and the 1585 establishment of the English Barbary Company, which had the objective of developing trade between England and Morocco. Diplomatic relations and an alliance were established between Elizabeth and the Barbary states.

The last years of the 16th century saw major English successes against Spain, with the English victory against the Spanish Armada in 1588, and the capture of Cádiz by the Earl of Essex in 1596. As a result, Sultan Ahmad al-Mansur decided to send an embassy to propose a joint invasion of Spain. Abd al-Wahid bin Mas'ud was accompanied by al Haji Messa and al Haji Bahanet, as well as an interpreter named Abd el-Dodar, an Andalusian by birth, under cover of a trade mission to Aleppo with a stopover in London. Altogether, the embassy numbered 16 (including some prisoners being returned to England), and sailed on board The Eagle under Robert Kitchen. Abd al-Wahid bin Mas'ud reached Dover on 8 August 1600.

Abd al-Wahid bin Mas'ud spent 6 months at the court of Queen Elizabeth I during 1600 with the aim of negotiating an alliance against Spain. Abd al-Wahid bin Mas'ud spoke some Spanish, but he communicated to the Queen through his interpreter who spoke in Italian. They met with the Queen on 19 August and again on 10 September.

The Moroccan ruler wanted the help of an English fleet to invade Spain. While Elizabeth refused, she welcomed the embassy and accepted the establishment of commercial agreements involving the two countries. Queen Elizabeth and Sultan Ahmad continued to discuss various plans for combined military operations, with Elizabeth requesting a payment of 100,000 pounds in advance from Sultan Ahmad for the supply of a fleet, with Ahmad asking for an English ship to be sent to get the money. Discussions however remained inconclusive, and both rulers died within two years of the embassy.

== In popular culture ==
It has been suggested that Abd al-Wahid bin Mas'ud inspired the character of William Shakespeare's Moorish hero Othello, but others have argued that there is no connection. In 2016, David Serero played Othello in a Moroccan adaptation inspired by Abd al-Wahid bin Mas'ud.

The painting of Abd al-Wahid bin Mas'ud is held by the Barber Institute at the University of Birmingham.

== Sources ==
- Vaughan, Virginia Mason (12 May 2005). Performing Blackness on English Stages, 1500-1800. Cambridge University Press. ISBN 978-0-521-84584-7.
- Harris, Bernard (1958). "A Portrait of a Moor". Shakespeare Survey with Index 1–10: Volume 11, the Last Plays. 11: 89–99. ISBN 0-521-52347-8
