= François Pidou de Saint Olon =

French diplomat under Louis XIV

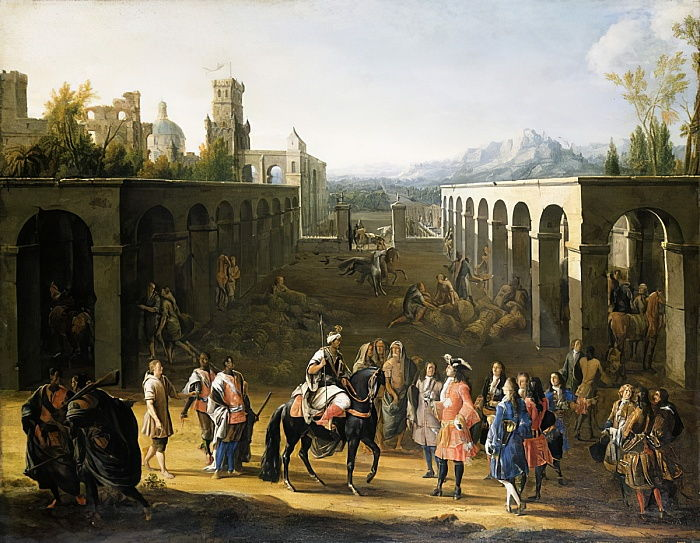
Ismaïl Ibn Sharif receiving Ambassador François Pidou de Saint Olon from Louis XIV, by Pierre-Denis Martin (1693).

François Pidou de Saint Olon (1640, Touraine - 1720, Paris) was a French diplomat under Louis XIV.

== Embassy to Genoa and Spain ==
In 1682, he was nominated as the first French resident envoy to the Republic of Genoa. He was then sent as an envoy to Madrid.

== Embassy to Morocco ==
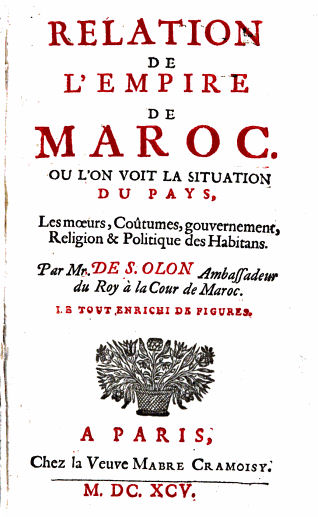
Relation de l'Empire du Maroc, by François Pidou de Saint Olon, 1695.

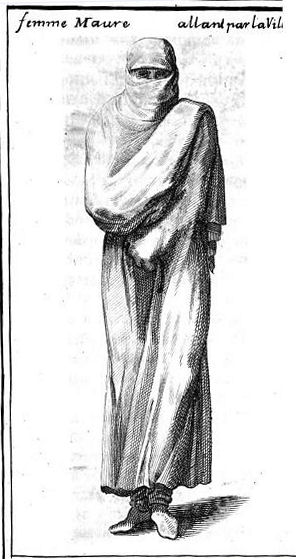
Moroccan woman in Estat présent de l'empire de Maroc, 1694.

in 1689, Pidou de Saint Olon was then nominated as ambassador to the court of the Moroccan ruler Mulay Ismail, in view of the signature of a commercial treaty. This responded to the Embassy of Mohammad Temim to Louis XIV in 1682. In 1690, Pidou de Saint Olon was in the city of Salé, where he visited the French Consul Jean-Baptiste Estelle.

His mission did not succeed however, and he only remained 2–3 weeks in Morocco. He wrote an account of his visit to Morocco, Relation de l'empire de Maroc ("The present state of the Empire of Morocco").

Another Moroccan ambassador Abdallah bin Aisha would visit France in 1699-1700.

François Pidou de Saint Olon died in Paris on 27 September 1720.

== See also ==
- France-Morocco relations

== Works ==
- Estat présent de l'empire de Maroc, 1694
- Relation de l'empire de Maroc, 1695
