= Jean Perillier =

Jean Perillier, also Périllié was a French Consul in Salé Morocco in the 17th century, from 1683 to 1689. He succeeded Henri Prat, who was Consul in Salé from 1648 to 1682, and was himself succeeded by Jean-Baptiste Estelle in 1689.

== See also ==
- France-Morocco relations

Preceded by Henri Prat	French Consul in Salé; 1648–1689	Succeeded by Jean-Baptiste Estelle
