= Franco-Moroccan Treaty (1631) =

The Franco-Moroccan Treaty of 1631 was a treaty signed between France and Morocco in 1631.

The negotiations were handled by Admiral Isaac de Razilly, after numerous discussions and encounters due to the problem of pirates from the harbour of Salé. After being able to enter into negotiations with Salé in 1630, Razilly purchased a quantity of French slaves from the Moroccans.

Razilly visited Morocco again in 1631, and participated to the negotiation for a Franco-Moroccan Treaty.

The Treaty gave France preferential treatment, known as Capitulations: preferential tariffs, the establishment of a Consulate and freedom of religion for French subjects.

The Treaty was ratified by Louis XIII in 1632.

== See also ==
- List of treaties
- France-Morocco relations
