= Moroccan embassy to France (1781) =

1781 diplomatic mission

A Moroccan embassy to France was sent in April 1781 by Sultan Mohammed ben Abdallah. The embassy was led by the rais Ali Pérés.

The embassy failed to be recognized by Louis XVI however, because it had not been properly accredited by the French Consul in Morocco Louis Chénier and that the title of the King of France had not been properly rendered.

Following this incident, Louis Chénier was summoned by Mohammed ben Abdallah on 21 September 1781, and was expelled from Morocco.

== See also ==
- France-Morocco relations
