= Jean-Baptiste Estelle =

French diplomat (1662–1723)

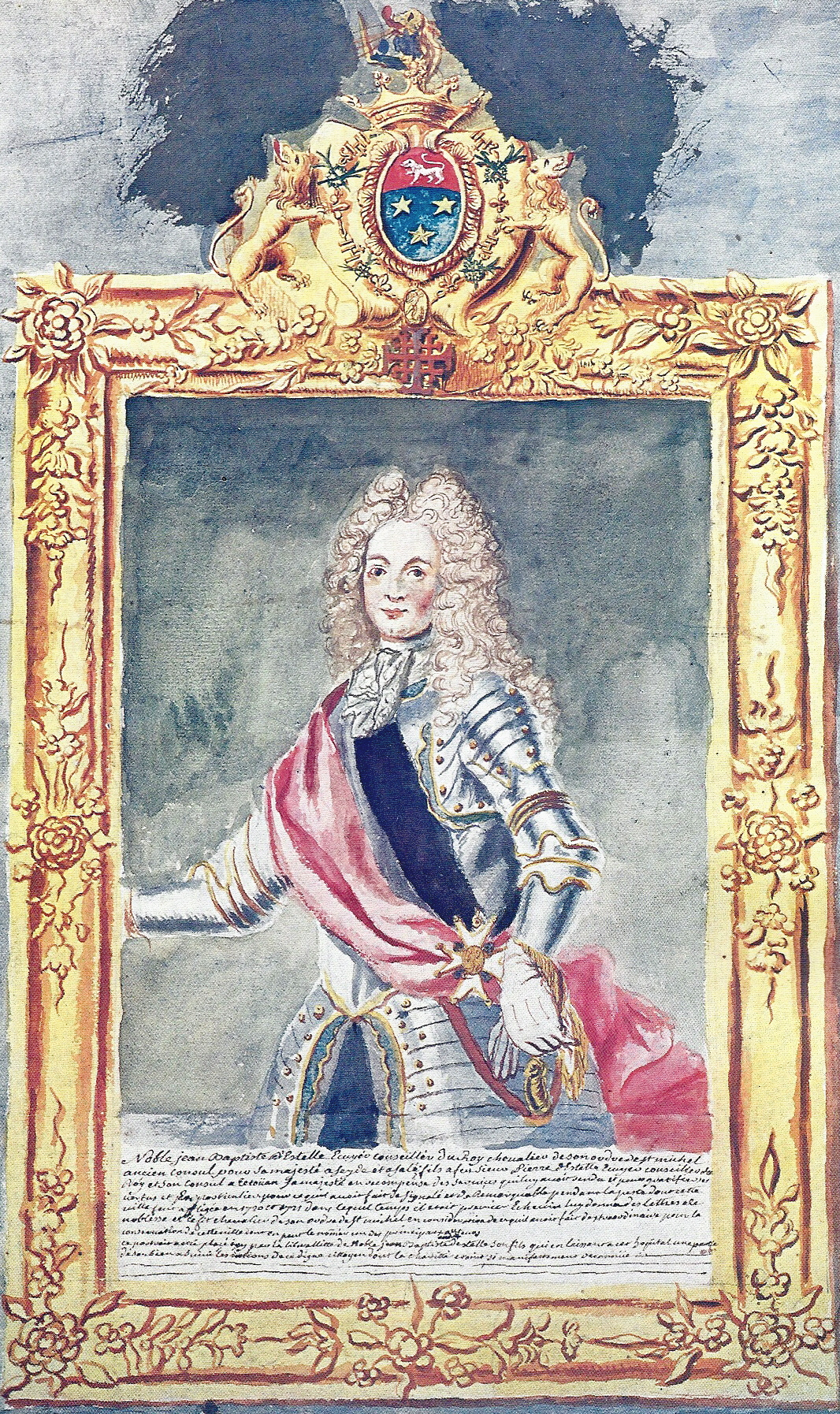
Jean-Baptiste Estelle.

Jean-Baptiste Estelle (1662, Marseille – 1723, Marseille) was French Consul in the Moroccan city of Salé in 1689–98. He was the son of Pierre Estelle, Consul at Tetuan. He succeeded Jean Perillier as consul at Salé.

In 1680, at the age of 18, he went to Algiers for 3 years, where his father was Consul.

In 1689, he was nominated as Consul of Salé. In Salé, he was staying in the house of Abraham Maimrān. In 1690, he was visited by the French Ambassador to Mulay Ismail, Pidou de Saint Olon. He had to leave his post in 1698 at the request of the Sultan Mulay Ismail.

At the age of 58, in 1720, he was mayor ("Premier échevin") of the city of Marseille, during the Great Plague of Marseille. He became part of the nobility in 1722, and received the title of "Seigneur d'Arenc".

== See also ==
- France-Morocco relations

Preceded by Jean Perillier	French Consul in Salé; 1689–1699	Succeeded by ?
