= Muhammad as-Saffar =

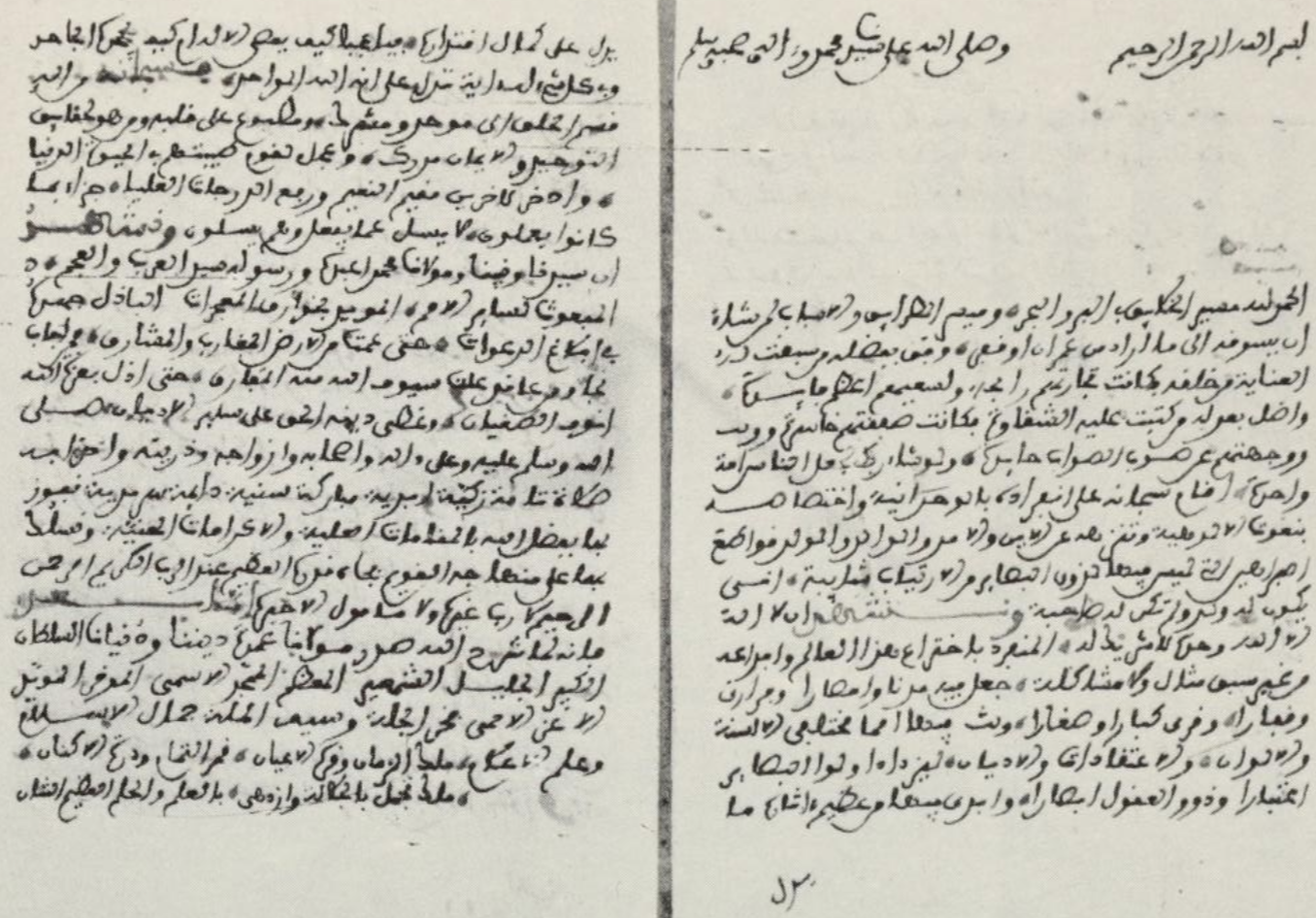
The original manuscript of the rihla, handwritten for the sultan by Muhammad as-Saffar upon his return from France.

Muḥammad Bin Abdellah aṣ-Ṣaffār (Arabic: محمد بن عبد الله الصفار) was a Moroccan faqih, royal scribe, and author of ar-Rihla at-Tetuania Ila ad-Diar al-Faransia (الرحلة التطوانية إلى الديار الفرنسية), a work of rihla literature about his journey with the Moroccan mission to France in 1845.
