= Mohammad Temim =

Moroccan diplomat

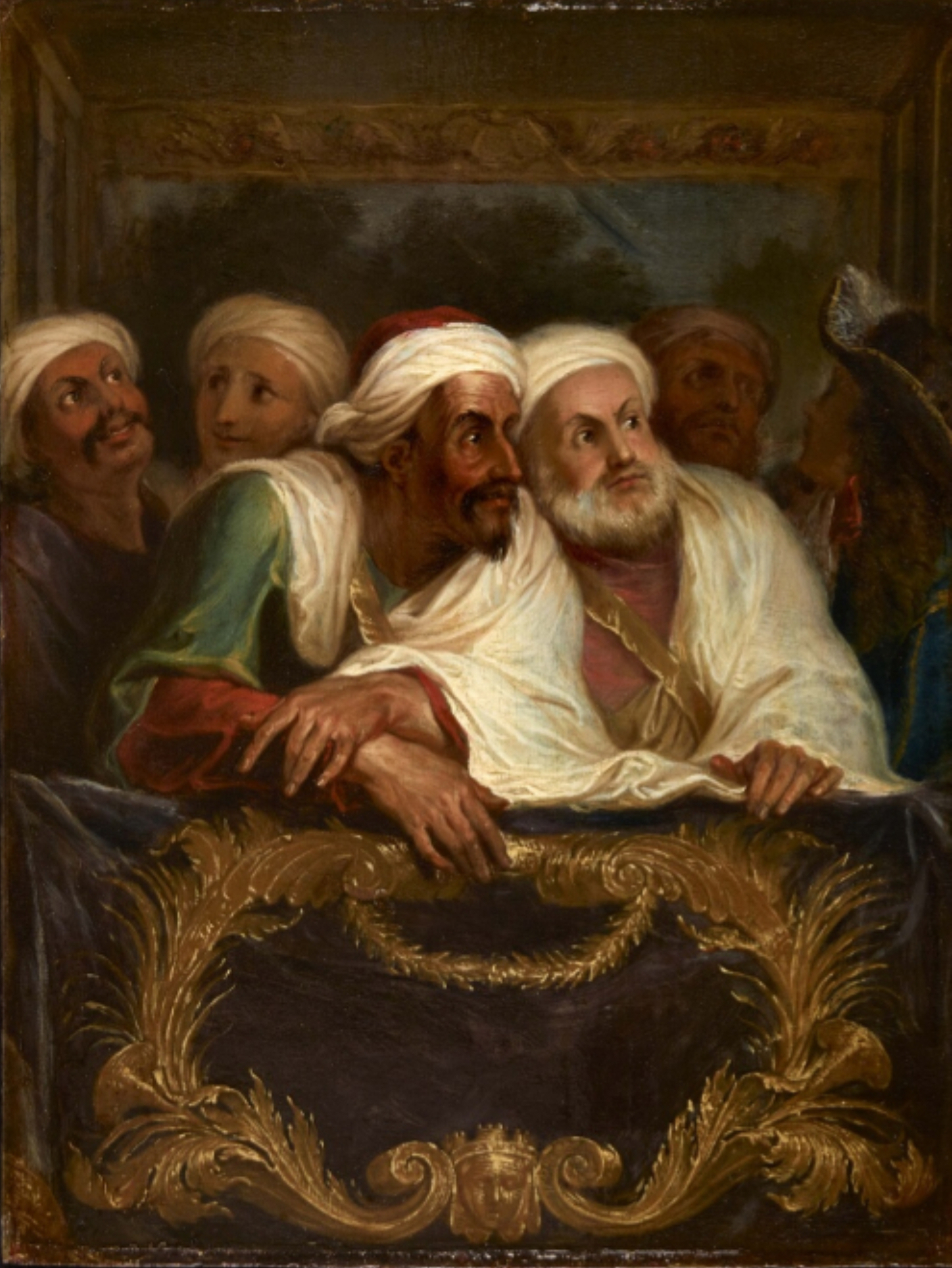
Mohammed Temim, Ambassadeur du Maroc, à la Comédie Italienne (1682), Antoine Coypel (1661-1722), Versailles.

Mohammad Temim (Arabic: الحاج محمد تميم), also Haji Mohammad Temim (French: Aggi Mohamed) was an ambassador of the Moroccan king Mulay Ismail to France. Mohammad Temim was accompanied by Ali Manino, as well as six other ambassadorial members. They visited Paris in 1682. He was able to explore many aspects of French intellectual and artistic life. He attended a performance of Lully's Atys. He also visited Notre-Dame de Paris where he attended an organ performance. Mohammad Temin showed great interest in arts and sciences. Upon his return, he received beautiful farewell gifts from Louis XIV.

Another Moroccan ambassador Abdallah bin Aisha would visit France in 1699-1700.
