= Abdallah ben Aisha =

Moroccan linguist and diplomat

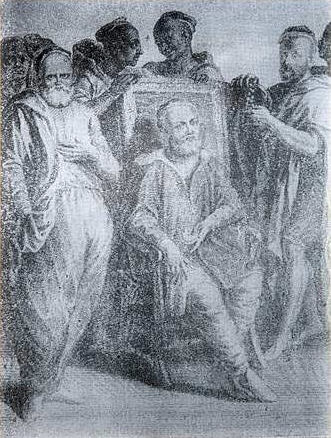
Ambassador Admiral Abdallah ben Aisha during his visit to France.

Abdallah ben Aisha (Arabic: عبد الله بن عائشة), also Abdellah bin Aicha, was a Moroccan Admiral and ambassador to France and England in the 17th century. Abdallah departed for France on 11 November 1698 in order to negotiate a treaty. He spoke Spanish and English fluently, but not French. His embassy followed the visit of François Pidou de Saint Olon to Morocco in 1689.

Abdallah met with Louis XIV on 16 February 1699. He was welcomed warmly in Paris and visited many landmarks. He also met with the deposed English king James II, exiled in France at that time, whom he had apparently known in his youth when he had been a captive in England.

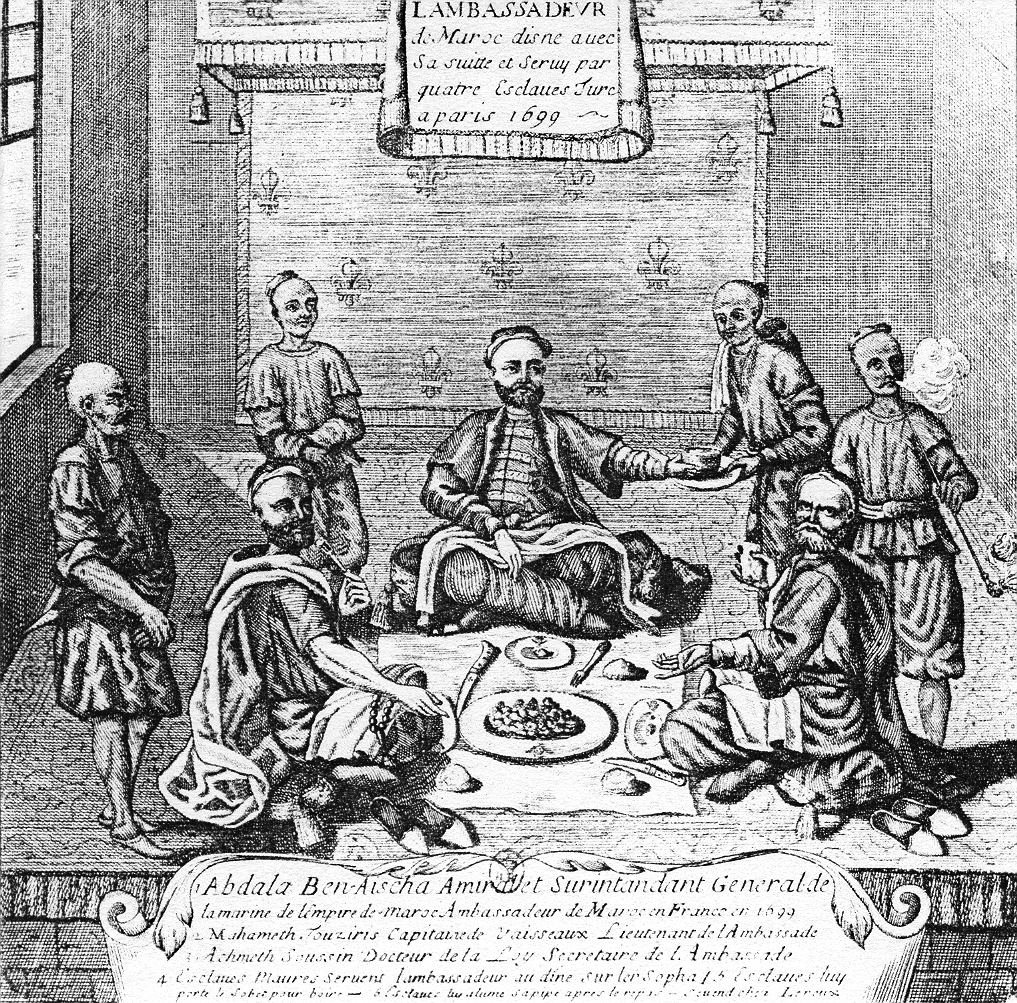
The Ambassador of Morocco Abdallah ben Aisha in Paris in 1699.

One of Abdallah's main missions had been to obtain an agreement to prevent the capture of Muslims by French ships, and to obtain the return of captured Moroccan pirates employed on French galleys. Louis XIV however denied a treaty, and on the contrary boasted about his power to the Moroccan king.

After Abdallah's return to Morocco, numerous letters continued to be exchanged with France, and the Moroccan ruler Mulay Ismail even offered James II military support to reinstall him on the English throne if he wished to convert to Islam, and if not, at least to Protestantism.

== See also ==
- Islam and Protestantism
- Anglo-Moroccan alliance
- Franco-Ottoman alliance
