= Sousse =

Sousse سوسة Sūsah
- City
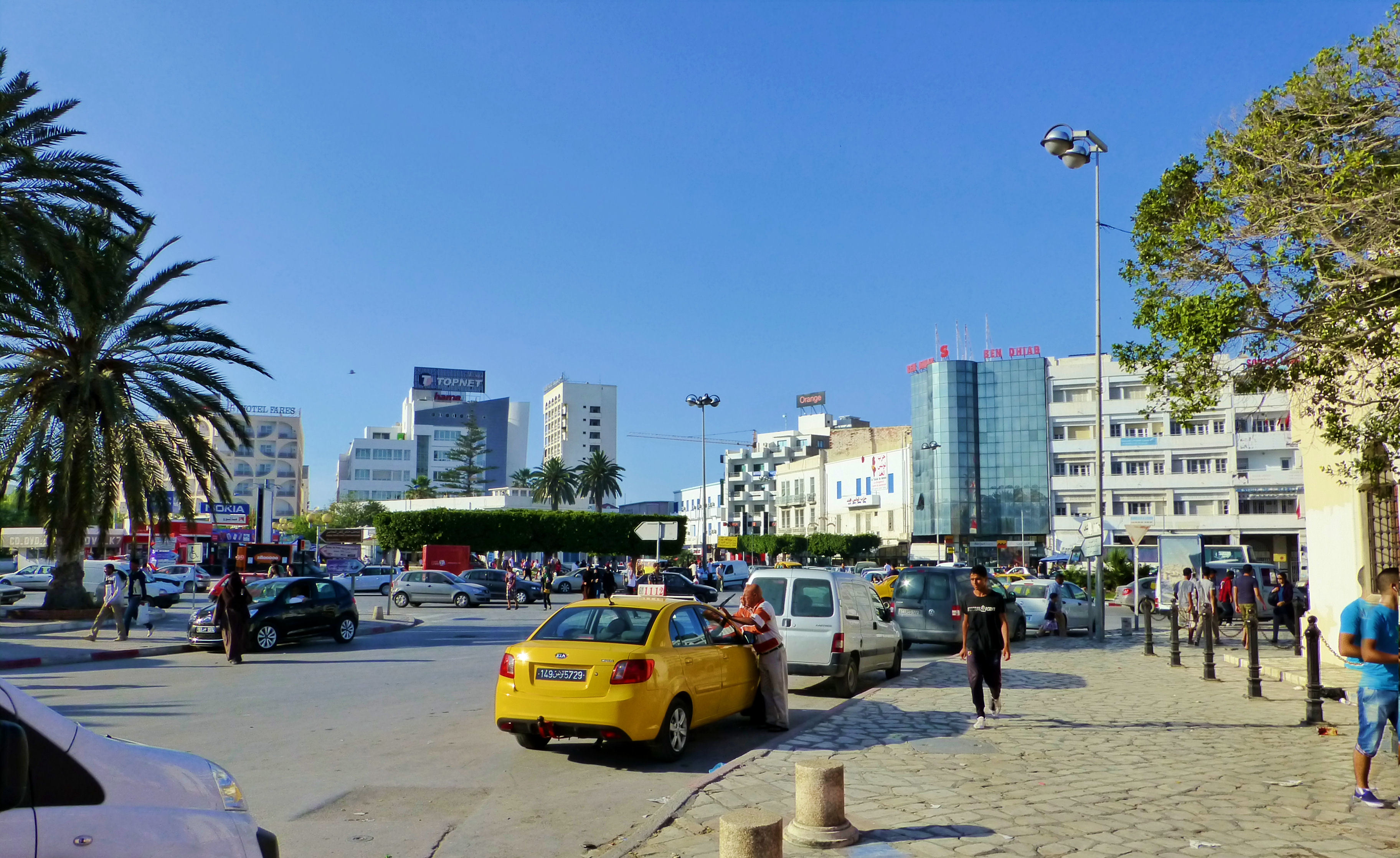
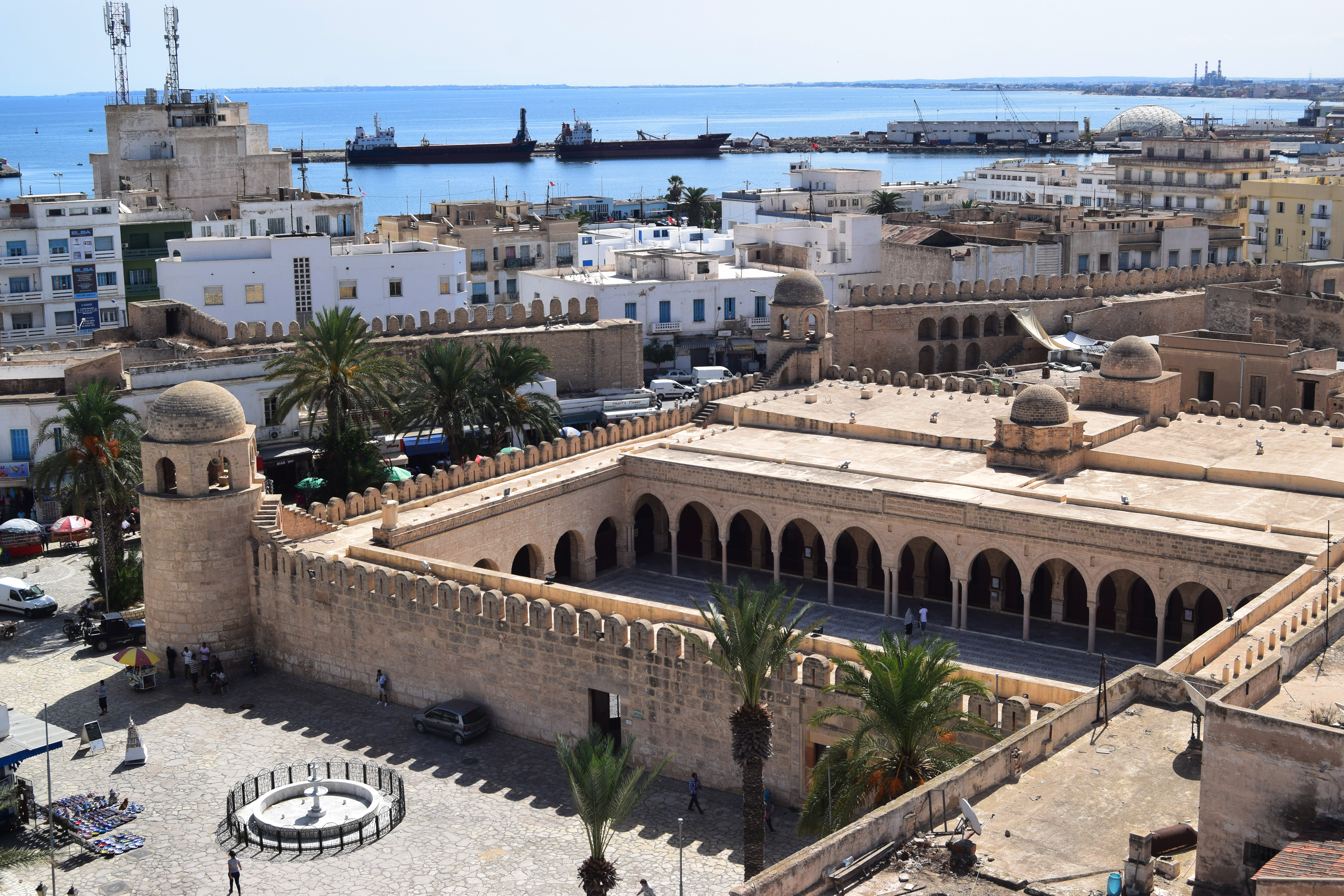
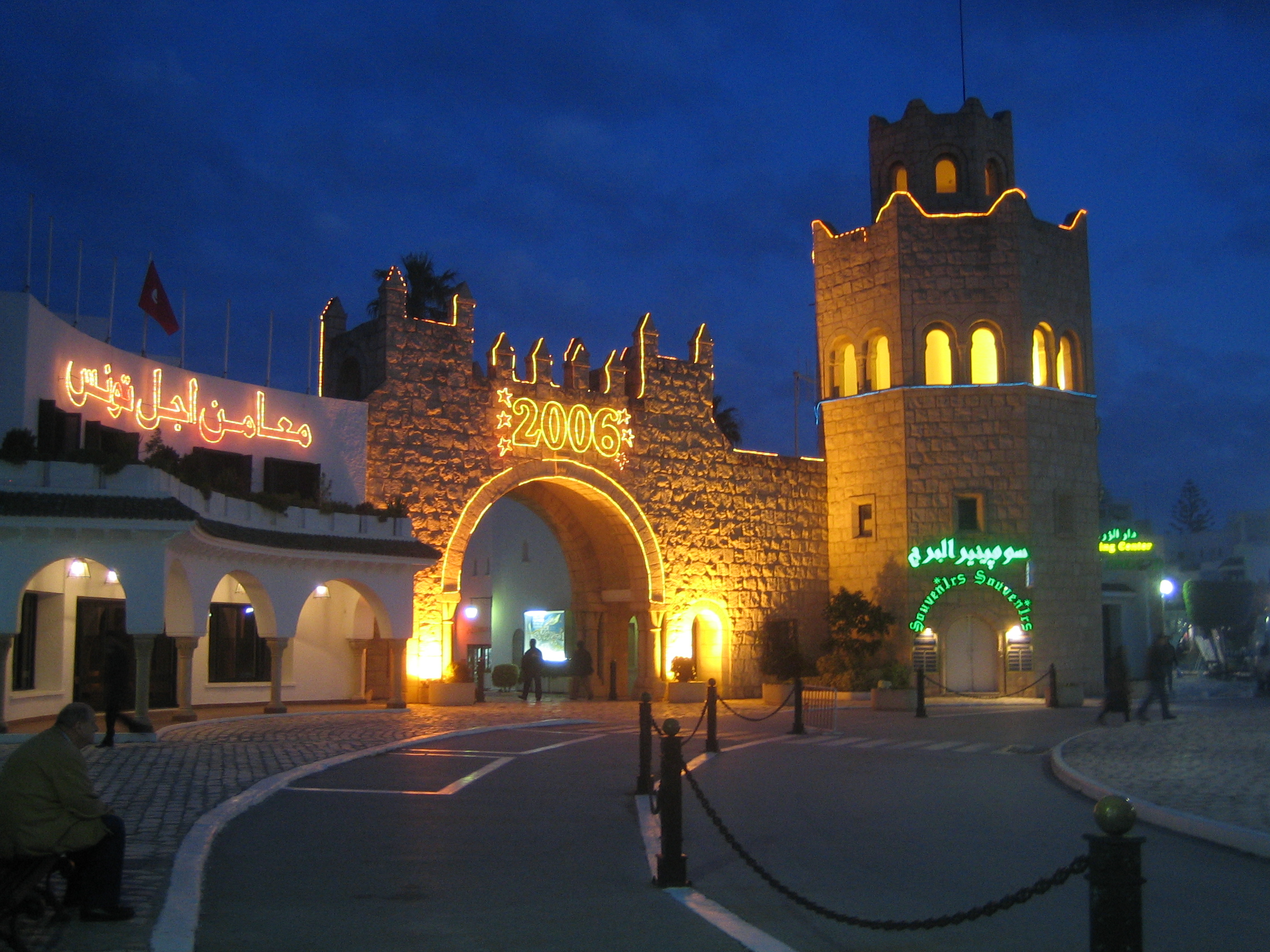
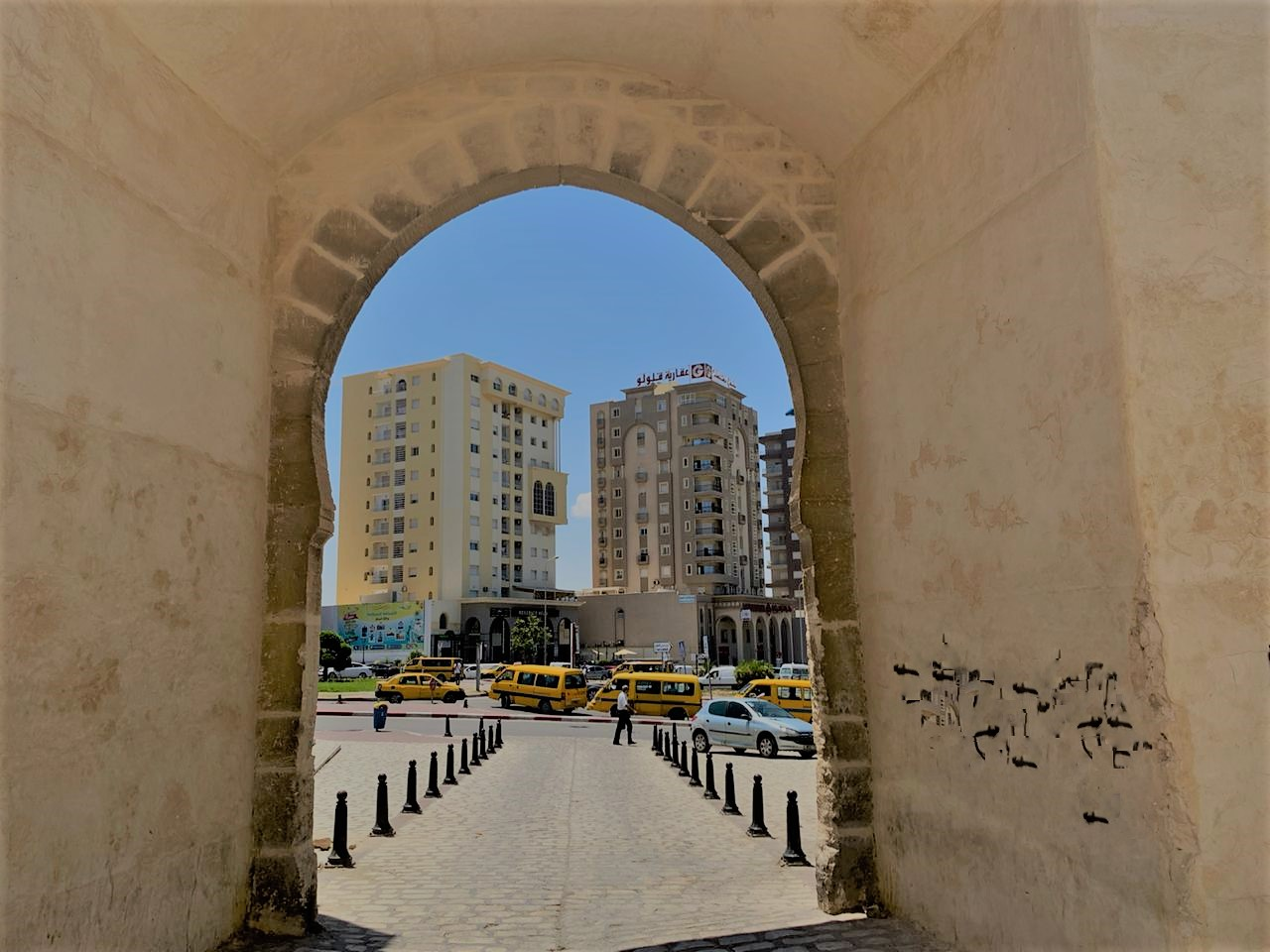
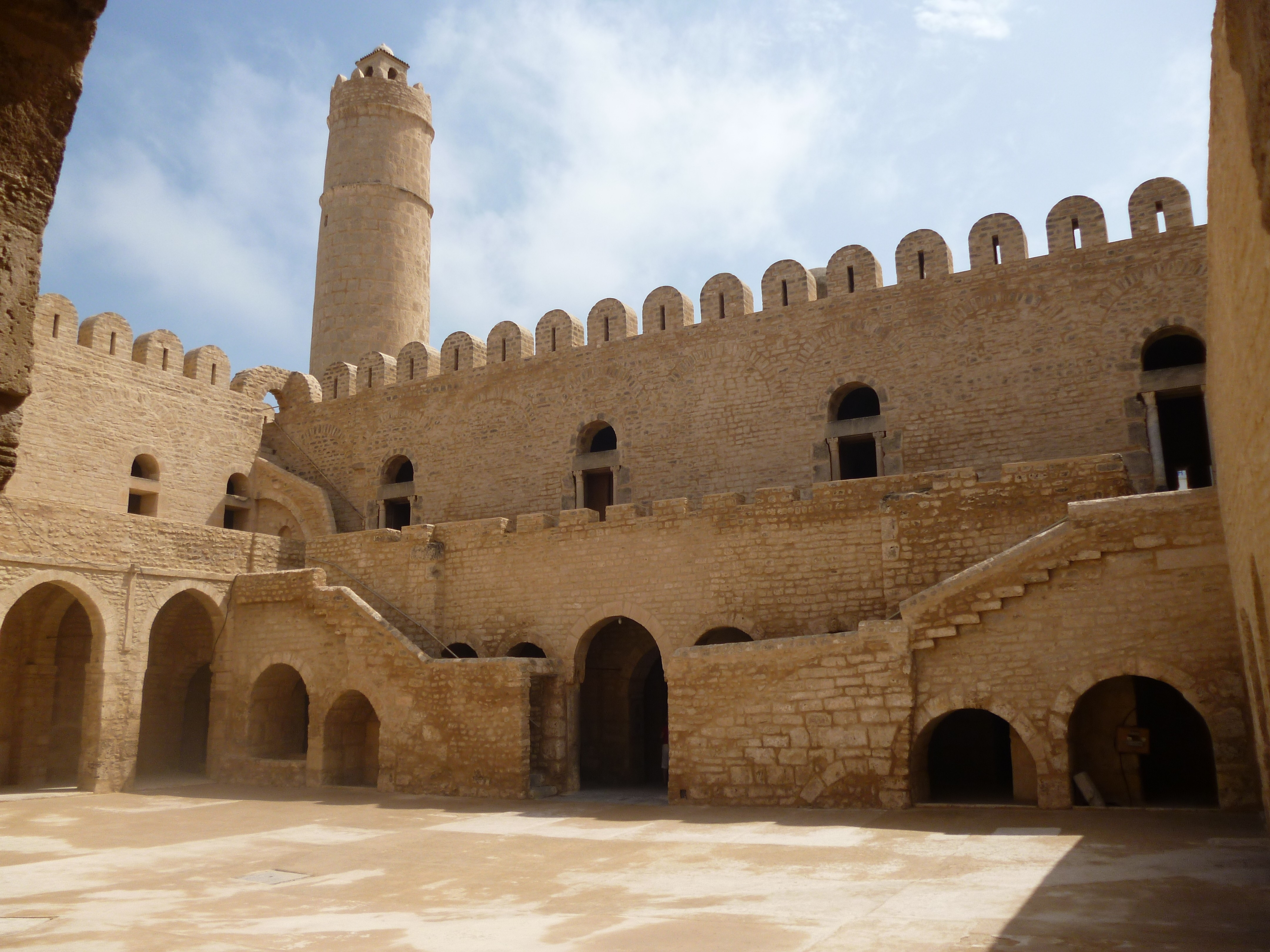
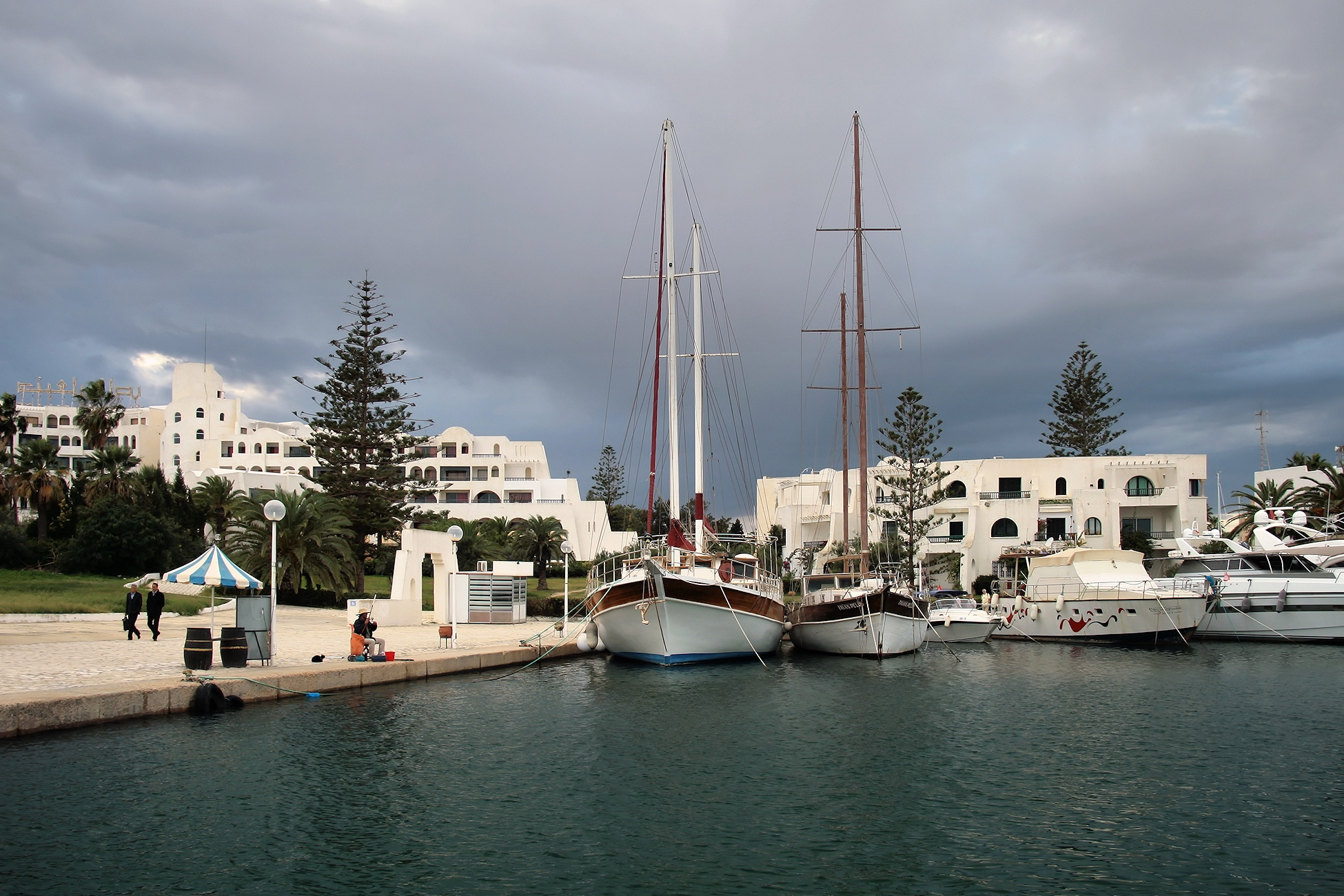
- Counter-clockwise from top: Centre Ville of Sousse, aerial view of Sousse, Great Mosque of Sousse, Port El Kantaoui, El Finga, Medina of Sousse

- Flag Seal
- Nicknames: "The pearl of the Sahel"
- Location in Tunisia
- Coordinates: 35°50′N 10°38′E
- Country: Tunisia
- Governorate: Sousse Governorate
- Delegation(s): Sousse Jawhara, Sousse Medina, Sousse Riadh, Sousse Sidi Abdelhamid

Government
  - Mayor: Mohamed Ikbel Khaled (Independent)

Population (2022)
  - City: 314,071
  - Density: 640/sq mi (246/km^{2})
  - Metro: 753,670
- Time zone: UTC+1 (CET)
  - Summer (DST): UTC+1 (CET)
- Website: www.commune-sousse.gov.tn/fr

UNESCO World Heritage Site
- Official name: Medina of Sousse
- Criteria: Cultural: (iii)(iv)(v)
- Reference: 498bis
- Inscription: 1988 (12th Session)
- Extensions: 2010
- Area: 31.68 ha (0.1223 sq mi)
- Buffer zone: 60.99 ha (0.2355 sq mi)

Sousse, Sūsah, or Soussa (Arabic: سوسة, IPA: [ˈsuːsa]), is a city in Tunisia, capital of the Sousse Governorate. Located 140 km (87 mi) south of the capital Tunis, the city has 271,428 inhabitants (2014). Sousse is in the central-east of the country, on the Gulf of Hammamet, which is a part of the Mediterranean Sea. Its economy is based on transport equipment, processed food, olive oil, textiles, and tourism. It is home to the Université de Sousse.

== Toponymy ==
Sousse and Soussa are both French spellings of the Arabic name Sūsa. The present city has also grown to include the ruins of Hadrumetum, which had many names in several languages during antiquity.

== Geography ==
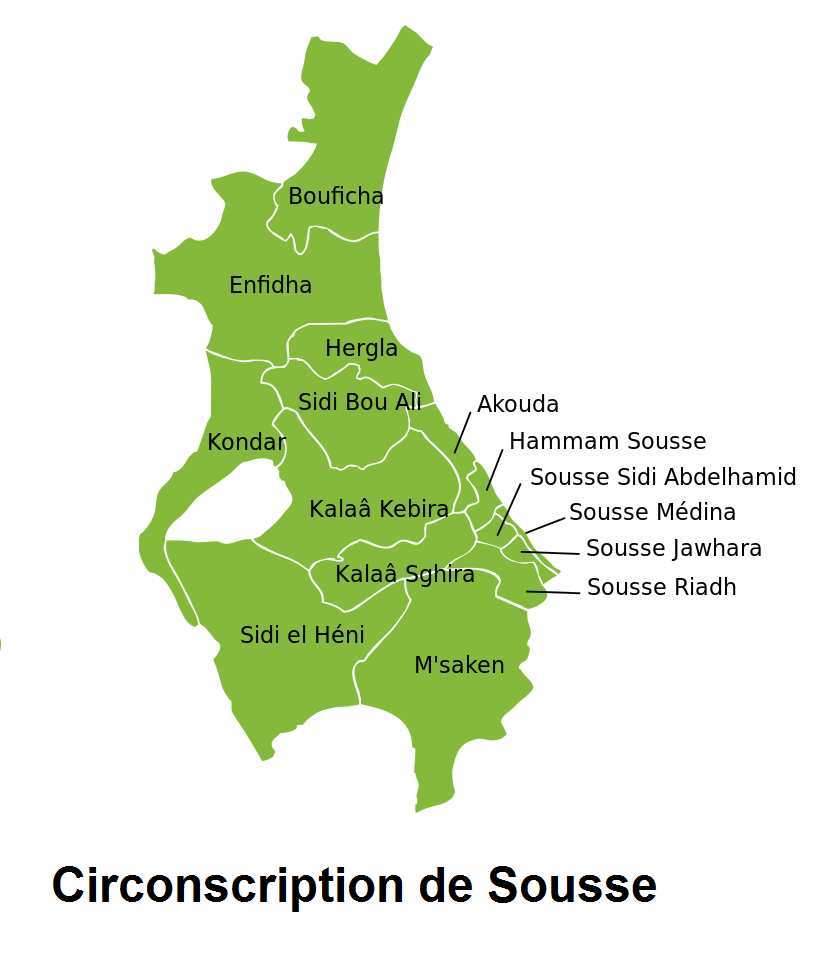
Sousse district

Sousse is in eastern Tunisia, on the Tunisian Sahel coast bordering the Mediterranean Sea. The city covers 45 km^{2} and is 25 meters above sea level.

Sousse is between two wadis: the Wadi Bliban (and its tributary the Wadi al-Kharrub) to the north and northwest and the Wadi al-Halluf to the southeast. The subsoil is mostly sedimentary with some deep alluvial deposits, which are more recent closer to the coast. Winters are generally mild, there is an average of 69 days of rainfall per year, and there is a lot of sunshine year-round with relatively few cloudy days.

=== Administration ===
The Municipality of Sousse is the capital of a governorate that extends over 2669 km^{2}. It is divided into four municipal districts: Sousse Nord, Sousse Sud, Sousse Médina and Sousse Riadh. The first two were created on 11 February 1976 and the last two on 19 February 1982. Its main constituencies and Delegation are four in number: Sousse Sidi Abdelhamid, Sousse Médina, Sousse Jawhara and Sousse Riadh. Its geographic code is 31.

== History ==
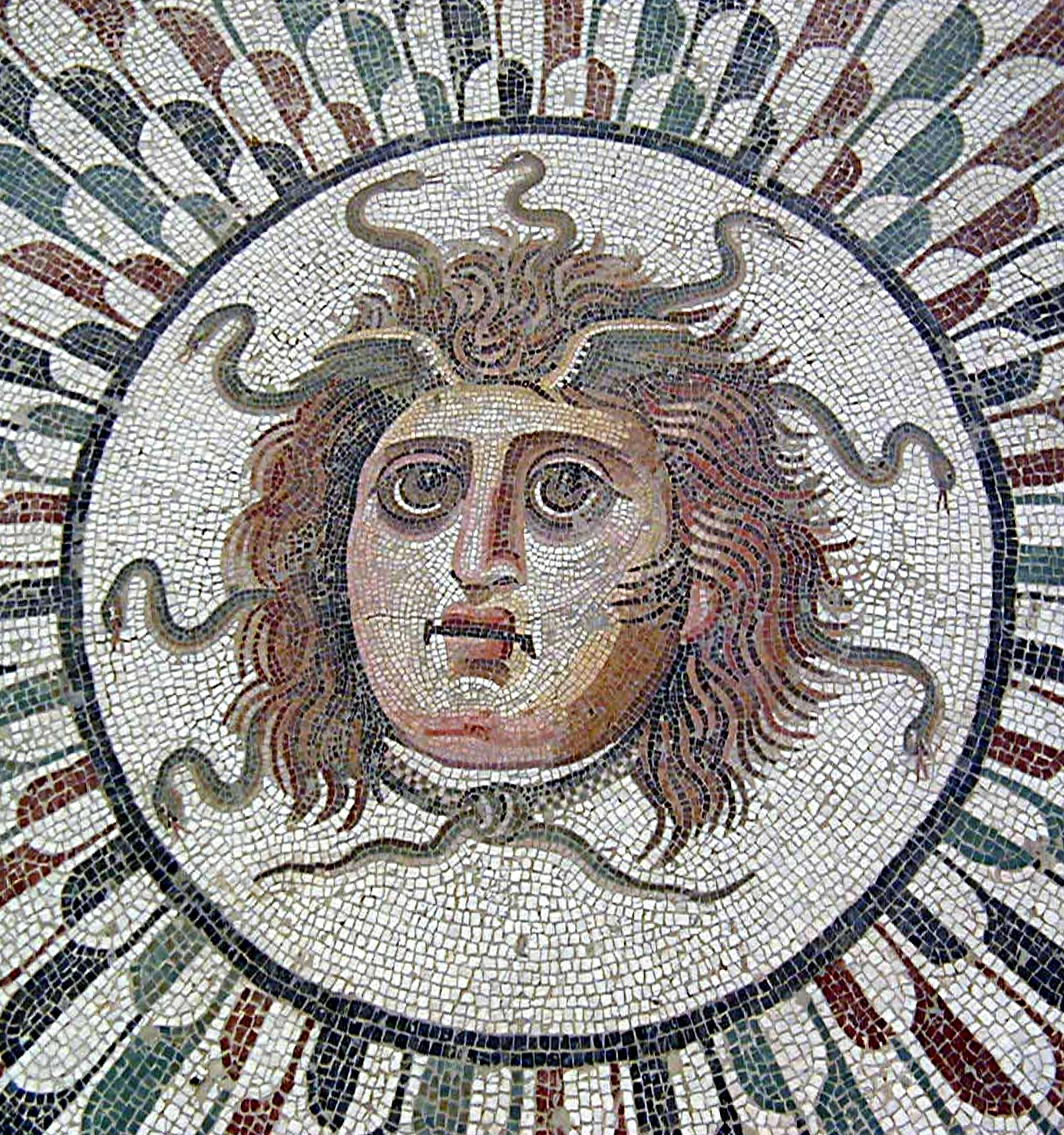
A mosaic depicting Medusa in the Museum of Sousse.

=== Hadrumetum ===
In the 11th century BC, Tyrians established Hadrumetum as a trading post and waypoint along their trade routes to Italy and the Strait of Gibraltar. Its establishment (at a river mouth about 9.7 km or 6 mi north of old Sousse) preceded Carthage's but, like other western Phoenician colonies, it became part of the Carthaginian Empire following Nebuchadnezzar II's long siege of Tyre in the 580s and 570s BC.

The city featured in the Third Sicilian War, the Second and Third Punic Wars (in the latter of which it secured additional territory and special privileges by aiding Rome against what was left of the Carthaginians), and Caesar's Civil War, when it was the scene of Caesar's famously deft recovery: upon tripping while coming ashore, he dealt with the poor omen this threatened to become by grabbing handfuls of dirt and proclaiming "I have you now, Africa!" (Latin: Teneo te Africa!) The second city in Roman Africa after Carthage, it became the capital of the province of Byzacena during the Diocletianic Reforms. Its native sons included the jurist Salvius Julianus, the emperor Clodius Albinus, and numerous Christian saints. The Roman and Byzantine catacombs beneath the city are extensive: they were mainly investigated in 1913-1927 by French missionaries and soldiers.

The Vandals sacked Hadrumetum in 434 but it remained a place of importance within their kingdom; a bishop and proconsul were martyred there during the Vandals' periodic forced conversions of their subjects to Arianism. The Byzantine Empire reconquered the town in 534 during the Vandal War and engaged in a public works program that included new fortifications and churches. The town was sacked during the Umayyad Caliphate's 7th-century conquest of North Africa. According to a 1987 ICOMOS report, Uqba ibn Nafi's siege and capture of the city resulted in its almost complete destruction, such that no monument of Hadrumetum "subsists in situ".

=== Medieval Susa ===
Muslim Arab armies rapidly spread Arab culture across what had been a thoroughly Romanized and Christianized landscape. Under the Aghlabids, Susa was established near the ruins of Hadrumetum and served as their main port. Their 827 invasion of Sicily was mainly launched from the town's harbor. After the Byzantine city of Melite (modern Mdina on Malta) was captured by the Aghlabids in 870, marble from its churches was used to build the Ribat. A soaring structure that combined the purposes of a minaret and a watch tower, it remains in outstanding condition and draws visitors from around the world. Its mosque is sometimes accounted the oldest surviving in the region and the town's main mosque, also built during the 9th century, has a similarly fortress-like appearance.

Susa was briefly occupied by Norman Sicily in the 12th century; it fell to the Ottoman Empire in the 16th; and it was bombarded by a French and Venetian fleet in the 18th.

Medieval Susa was known for its textile industries, producing silk and flax fabrics called Sūsī. Especially renowned were its robes called shuqqas, some of which were mass-produced and sold ready-to-wear throughout the Mediterranean.

After the decline of Mahdia in the 15th and 16th centuries, Susa remained as the most important town in the Sahel region, with a population of about 15,000.

=== Colonial Sousse ===
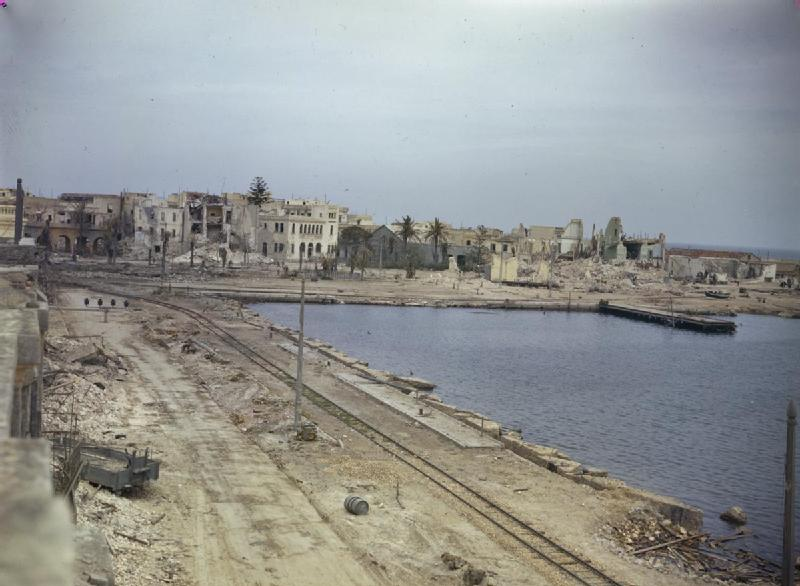
Damage to the port of Sousse after an Allied bombing raid, June 1943

Tunisia became a French protectorate in 1881. Around the end of the 19th century, Sousse had a population of 7,000 and was the second-most-important city in Tunisia after Tunis itself. At this point, the entire population of Sousse lived in the walled medina. The medina was surrounded by agricultural settlements, two of which - Kala Kebira and Msaken - were more densely populated than the city itself. The French Protectorate reinforced Sousse's role as a commercial and administrative center by establishing public buildings, enlarging the city's port, and building railways. Between 1896 and 1911, railways were built connecting Sousse with Tunis, Kairouan, Sfax, Mahdia, Moknin, and Henshir Suwatir. Food industries were also established in the city.

Before the First World War, Sousse had about 25,000 inhabitants, including around 10,000 French and roughly 5,000 other Europeans, mostly Italians and Maltese. The port was the garrison of the 4th Tunisian Rifle Regiment.

The first developments outside the medina walls were begun during this period, but they were home to a relatively small number of people until after the Second World War. Sousse was devastated by the war and suffered 39 bombardments between December 1942 and May 1943. In 1946, after the war was over, the authorities decided to give a high priority to reconstruction efforts in Sousse.

=== Modern Sousse ===
When Tunisia became independent in 1956, Sousse was made a wileya capital and it continued to expand in all directions. Over the course of the 20th century, its growth was explosive: from just 8,577 residents in 1885, it had grown to 134,835 residents in 1994. Its physical area had also increased massively, from a compact 29 hectares in 1881 to 3,100 hectares in 1992. The secondary and tertiary sectors of the economy also grew accordingly.

Sousse has retained the Arabian look and feel it assumed in the centuries after its initial conquest. Today it is considered one of the best examples of seaward-facing fortifications built by the Arabs. With a population of about 200,000, Sousse retains a medieval heart of narrow, twisted streets, a kasbah and medina, its ribat fortress and long wall on the Mediterranean. Surrounding it is a modern city of long, straight roads and more widely spaced buildings.

Sousse was the site of the chess interzonal in 1967, made famous when American Grandmaster Bobby Fischer withdrew from the tournament even though he was in first place at the time.

On 26 June 2015, a lone gunman, Seifeddine Rezgui Yacoubi, opened fire on tourists sunbathing on a beach near the Riu Imperial Marhaba and Soviva hotels, killing 38 and wounding 39, before being shot dead by the police.

== Cityscape ==
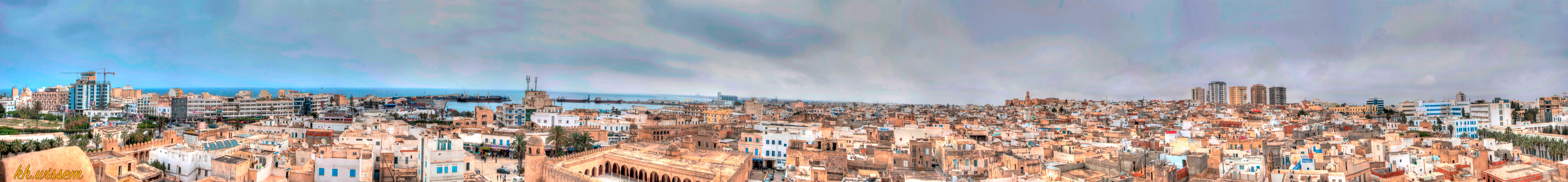
Panorama of Sousse

== Demography ==
Historical population
Year	Pop.	±%
1993	421,800	—
2006	568,200	+34.7%
2007	579,000	+1.9%
2008	590,100	+1.9%
2009	608,600	+3.1%
2010	621,758	+2.2%
2011	635,122	+2.1%
2012	648,695	+2.1%
2013	662,481	+2.1%
2014	677,500	+2.3%
2015	690,700	+1.9%
2016	703,600	+1.9%
2017	716,600	+1.8%
2019	737,027	+2.9%

As of 2019, Sousse's population was 737,027. Males represent 50.1% of the population structure (with a population of 509,456) against 49.9% by females (with a population of 507,426) in 2014.

== Public services ==
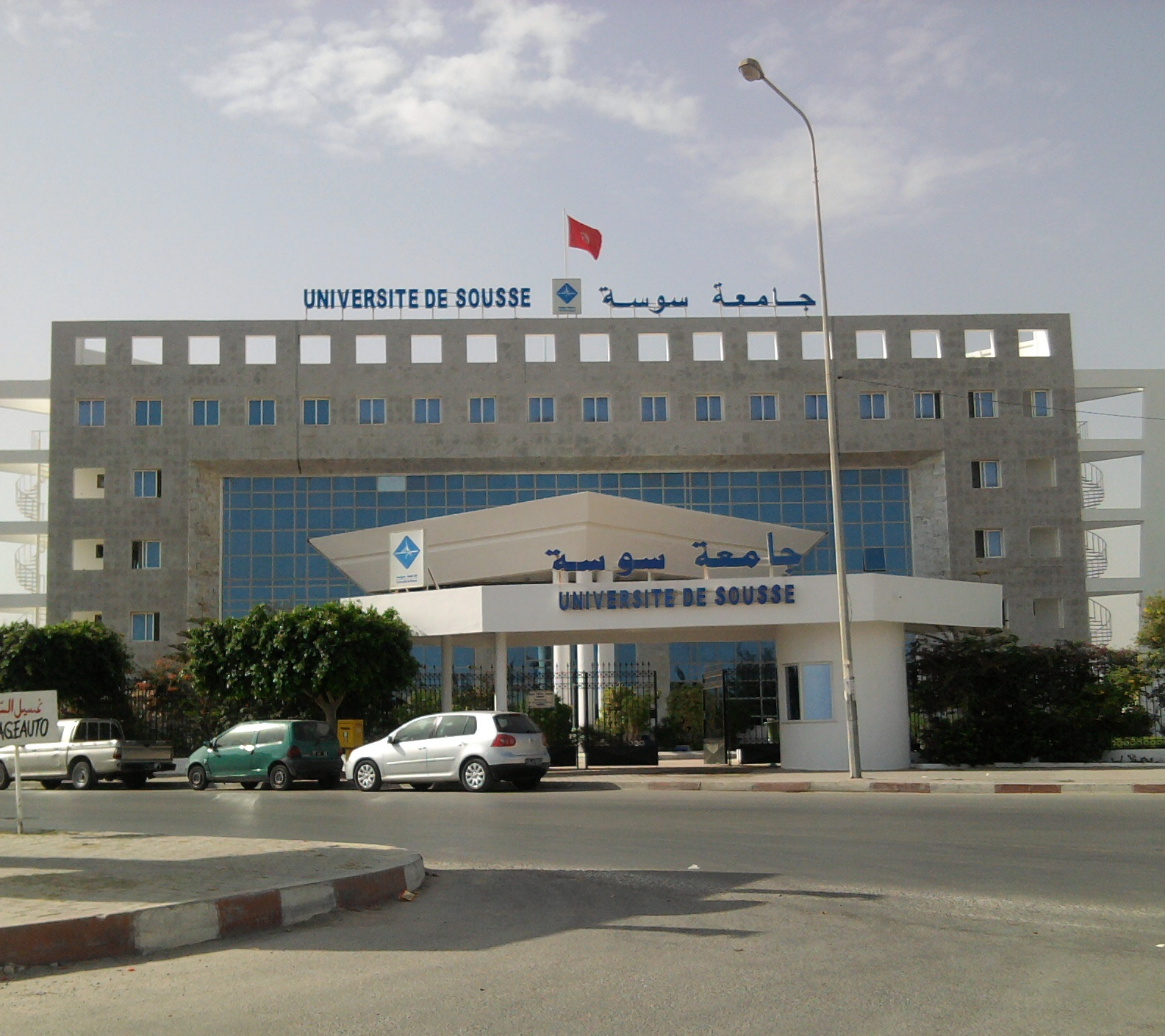
University of Sousse

The city contains the University of Sousse, formerly known as the University of the Center, including its Ibn El Jazzar, Faculty of Medicine, the Sousse National School of Engineers, and the Higher Institute of Music of Sousse, founded in 1999.

There are a number of high schools, such as the pilot high school of Sousse, the boys' high school, the Tahar-Sfar high school (formerly the young girls' high school), the 20 – March 1934 high school (technical high school), the Abdelaziz-El-Bahi high school or the Jawhara high school, and colleges, such as the Pilot College of Sousse, the Mohamed El Aroui College and the Constantine College.

Sousse is served by a hospital, the Hospital of Sahloul, the largest in the region.

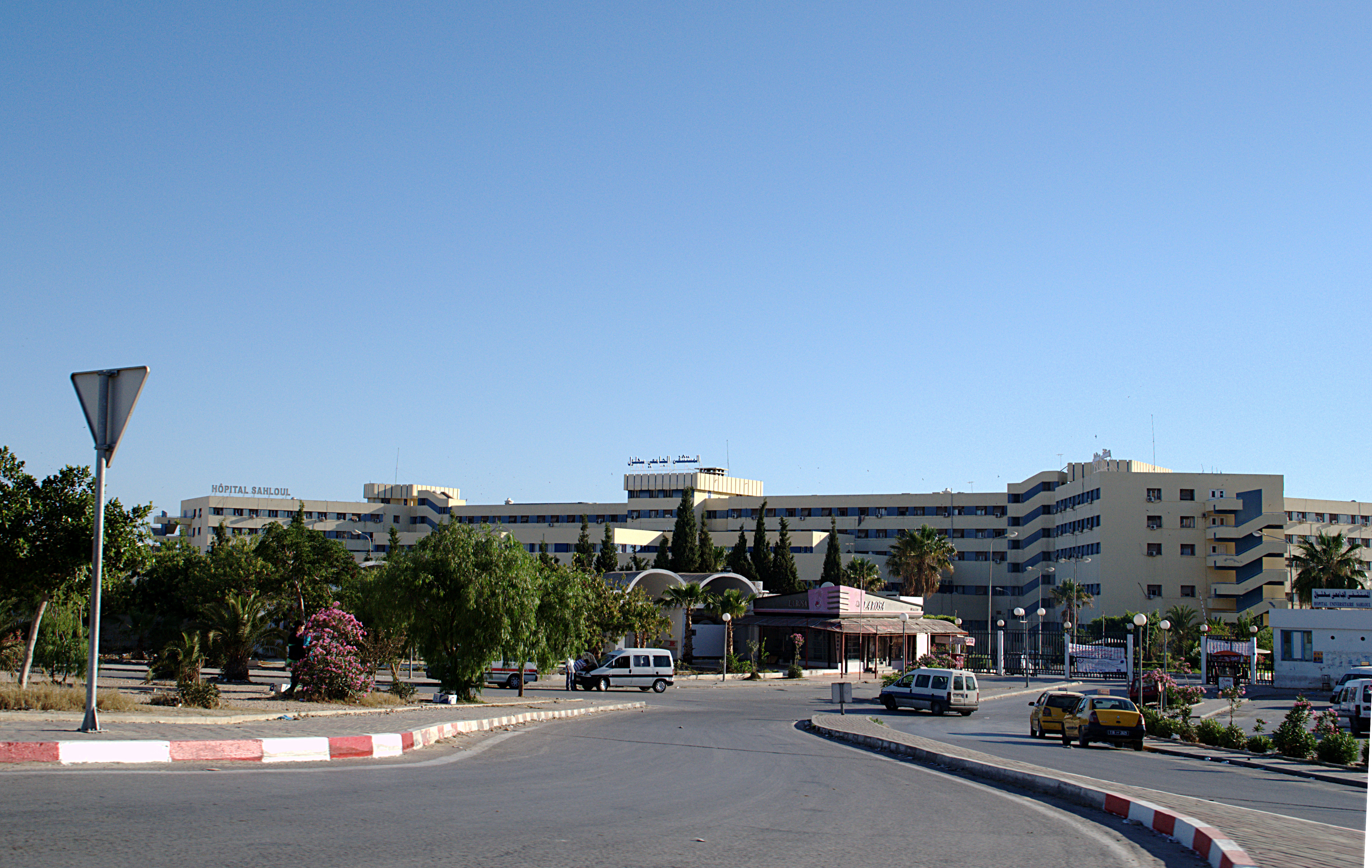

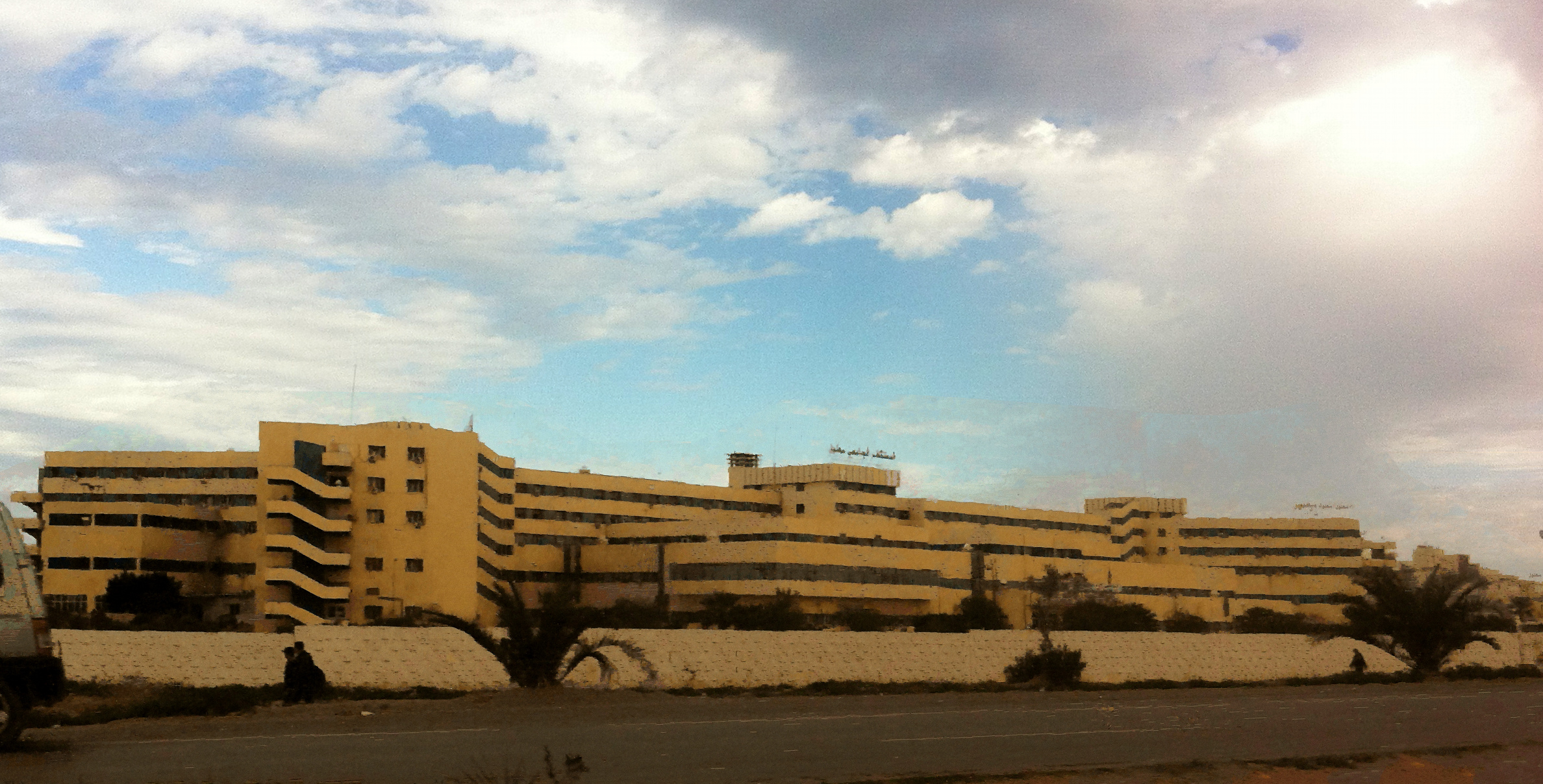

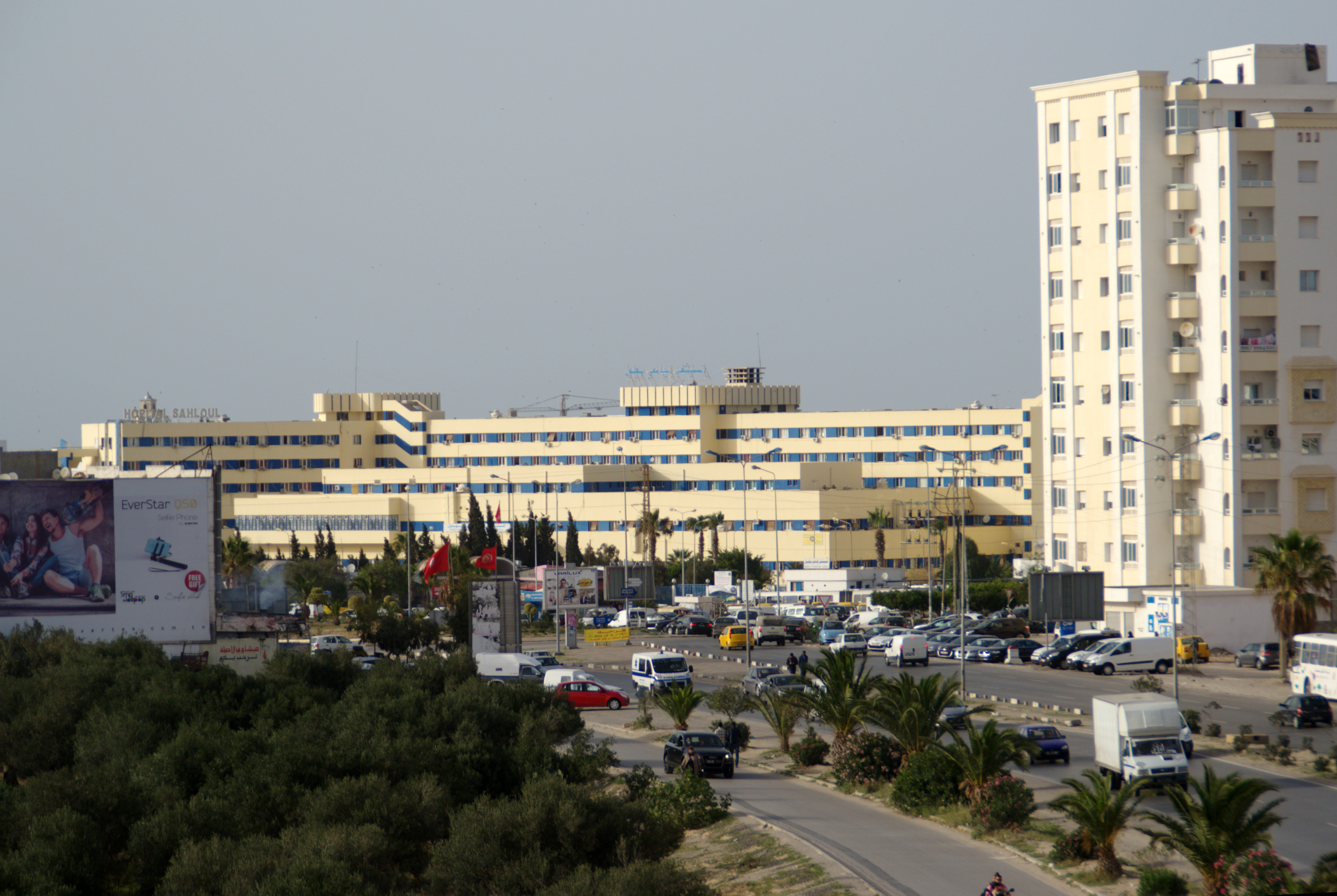

== Economy ==
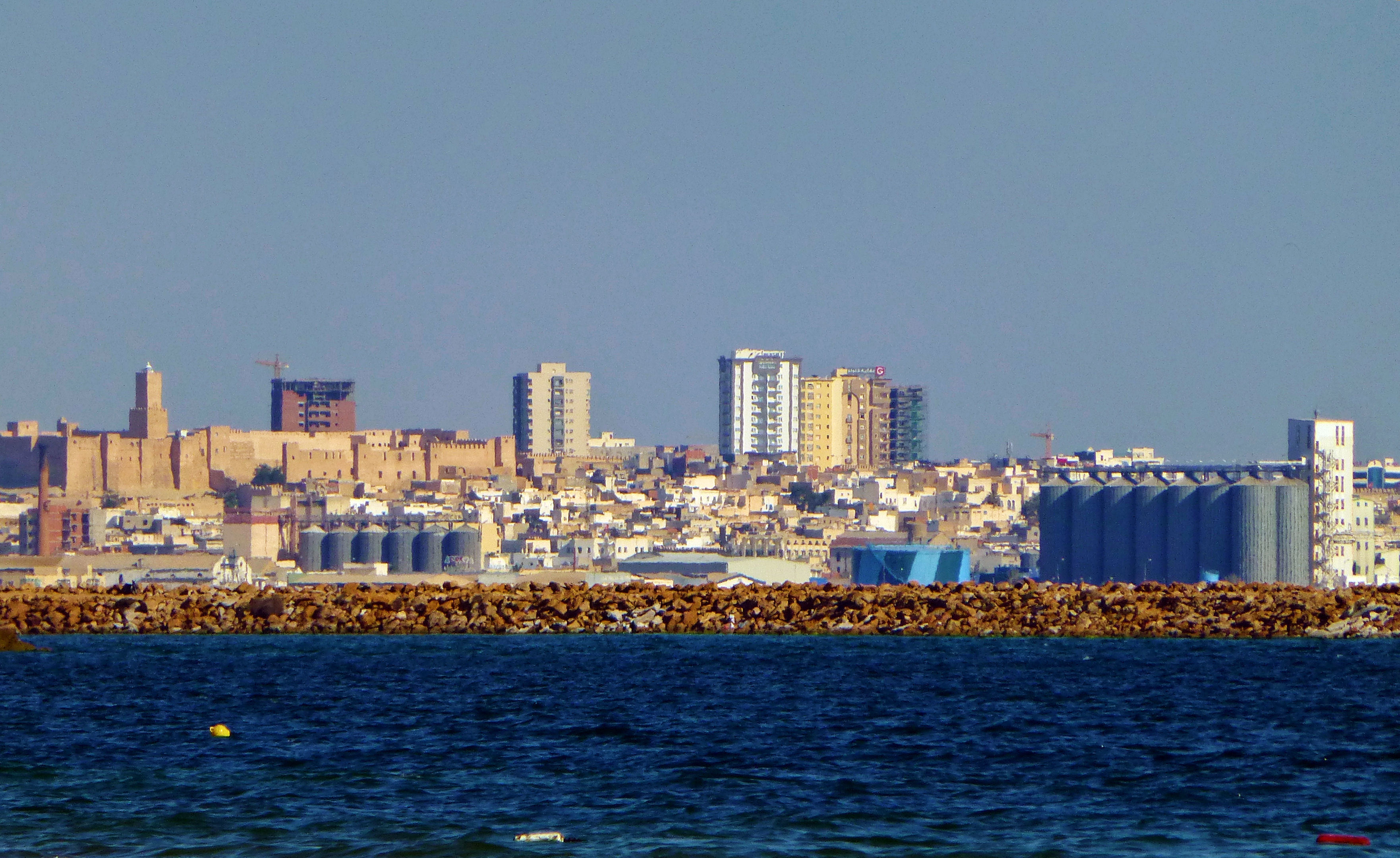
Sousse industrial zone

Sousse's most important economic activity takes place in the tertiary sector, which employs over 50% of the city's workforce and includes administration, education, healthcare, trade, communications, and banking. Not far behind is the secondary sector, which employs another 45% of the city's workers and includes industries like textiles and leather, construction, chemicals, electronics, and mechanical and electrical components. The small remainder is engaged in the primary sector, mainly fishing. Although smaller than the port in Sfax, Sousse has a port that serves an important commercial outlet for central Tunisia, particularly for the regions around Kairouan and Kasserine.

Sousse is the third largest city in Tunisia after Tunis and Sfax. Although it is associated with olive oil manufacture and has other industries, tourism predominates today. An olive grove covering more than 2,500 km^{2} (965 sq mi) constitutes one of its main riches since antiquity. The busy port near downtown adds a touch of liveliness to its activity. Sousse also had many oil wells in the area during its colonial period.

=== Tourism ===
Sousse is an important tourist resort. It has a hot semi-arid climate, with the seaside location moderating the climate, making it an all-season resort with hot, dry summers and warm, mild, wet winters. The fine sandy beaches are backed by orchards and olive groves.

Only 20 km (12 mi) from Monastir and Monastir Habib Bourguiba International Airport, hotel complexes with a capacity of 40,000 beds extend 20 km (12 mi) from the old city (medina) north along the seafront to Port El Kantaoui. Some 1,200,000 visitors come every year to enjoy its hotels and restaurants, nightclubs, casinos, beaches, and sports facilities.

Sousse is considered a popular tourist destination, especially due to its nightlife. The season traditionally begins at the start of June and finishes on the first weekend of October with the closing parties.

Beaches and some hotels in Sousse

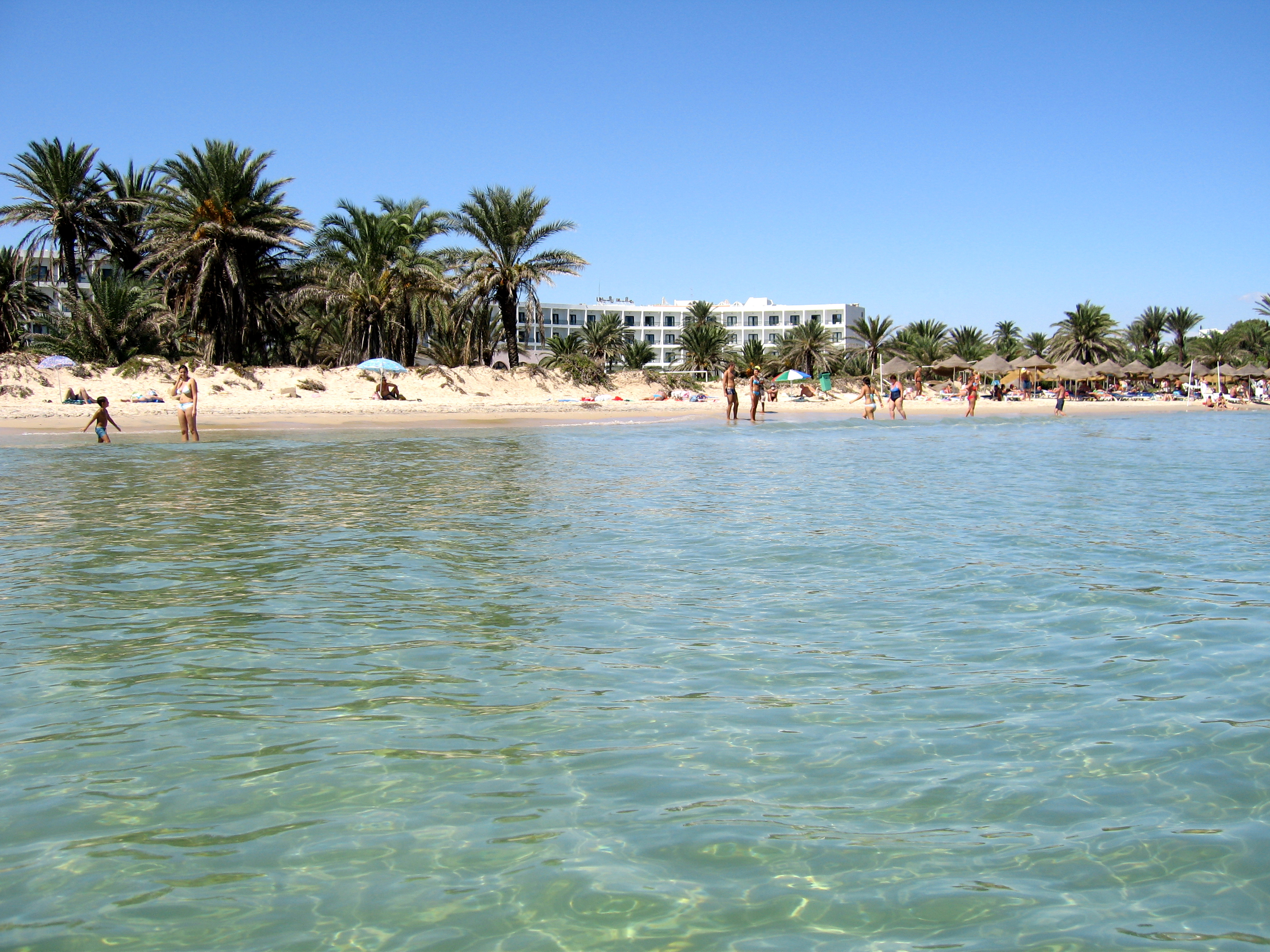

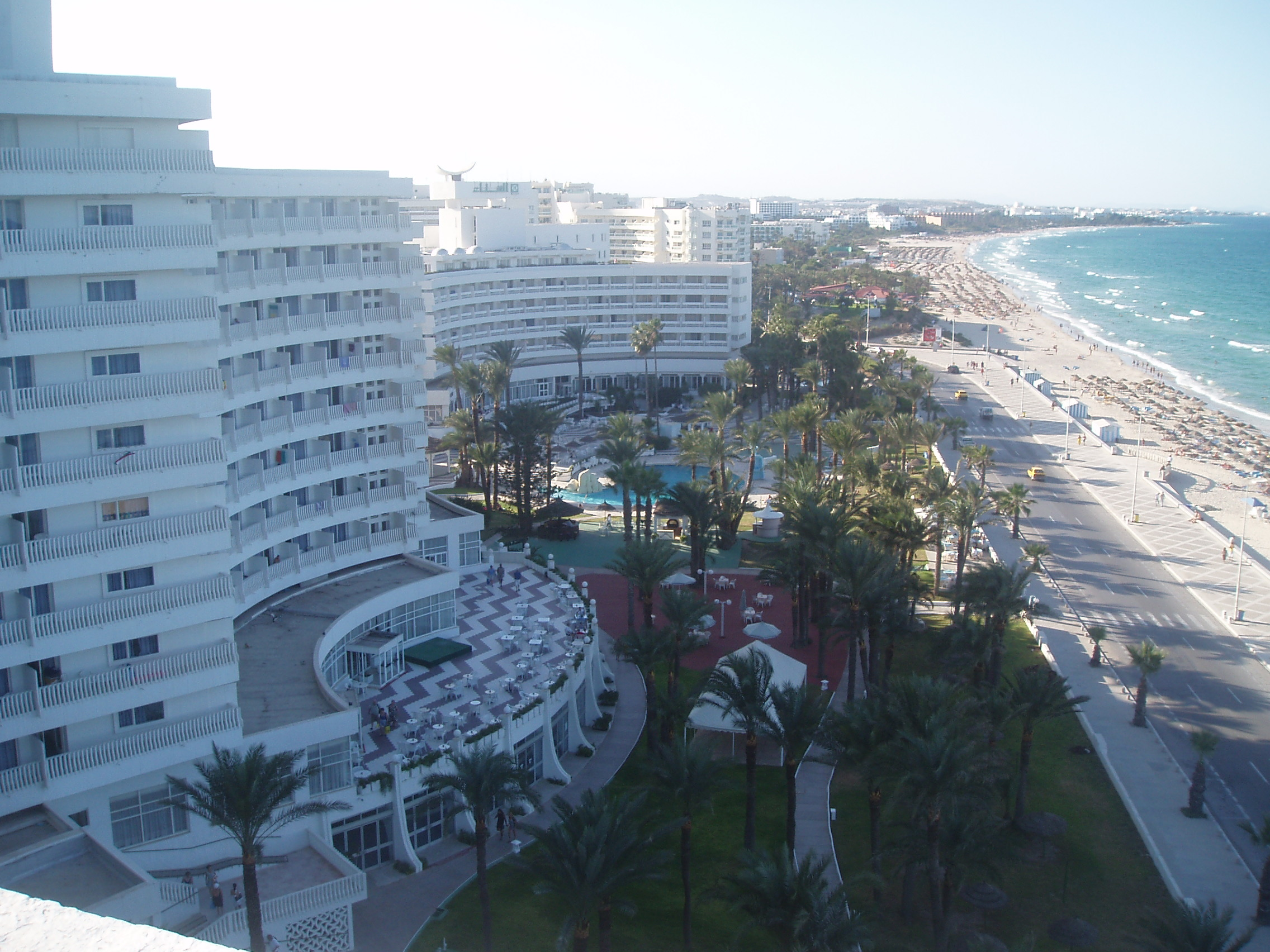

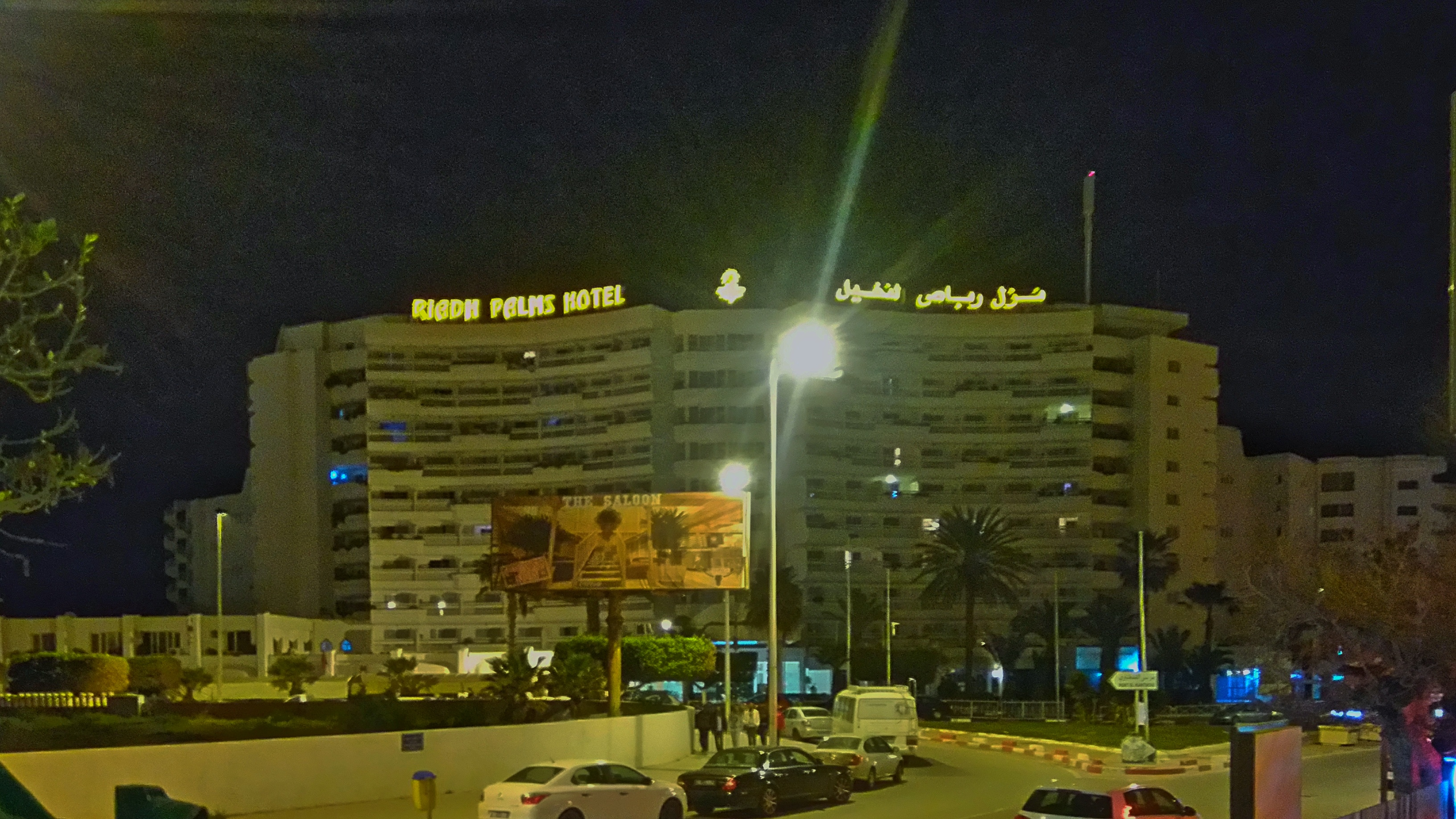

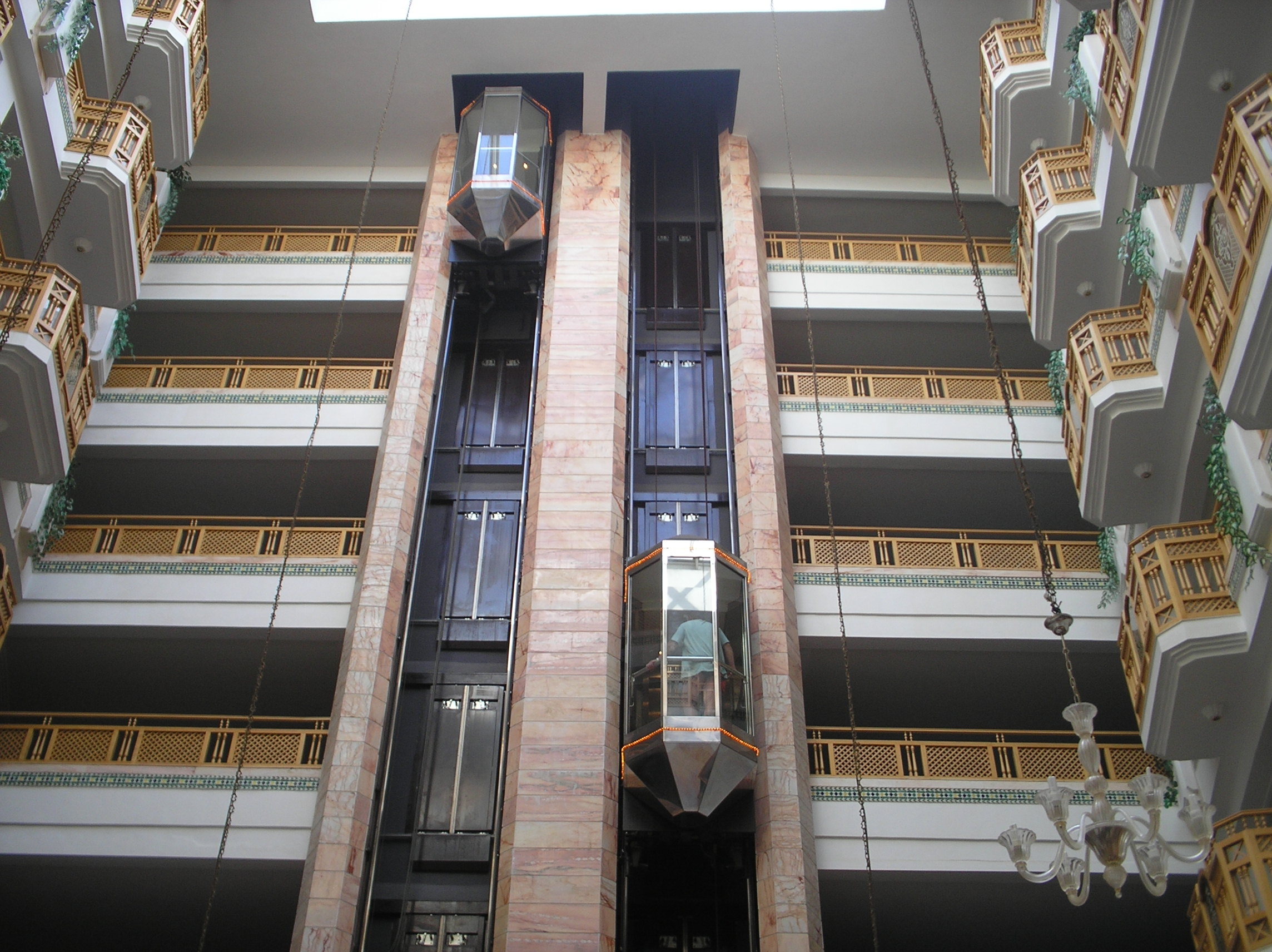

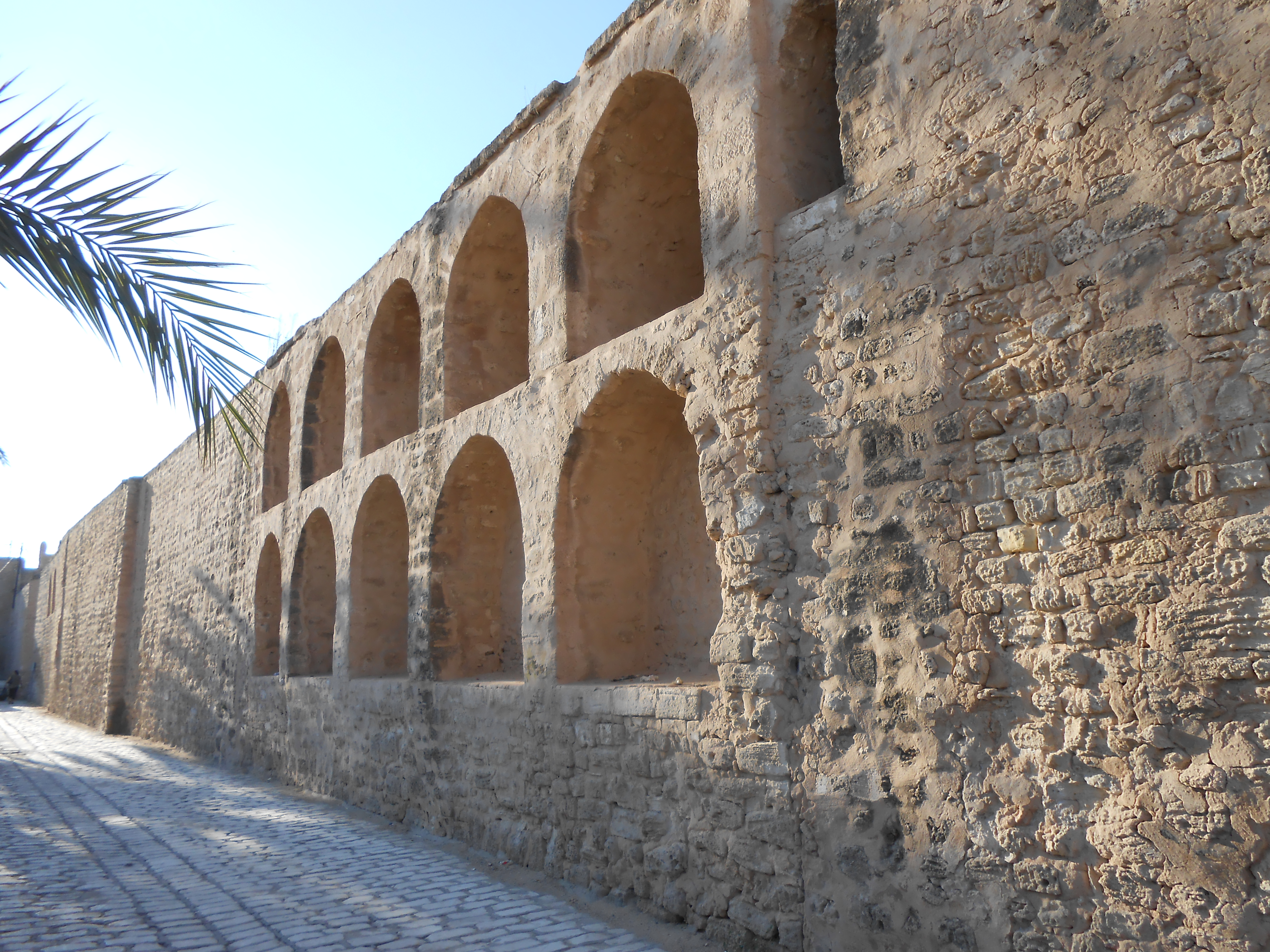

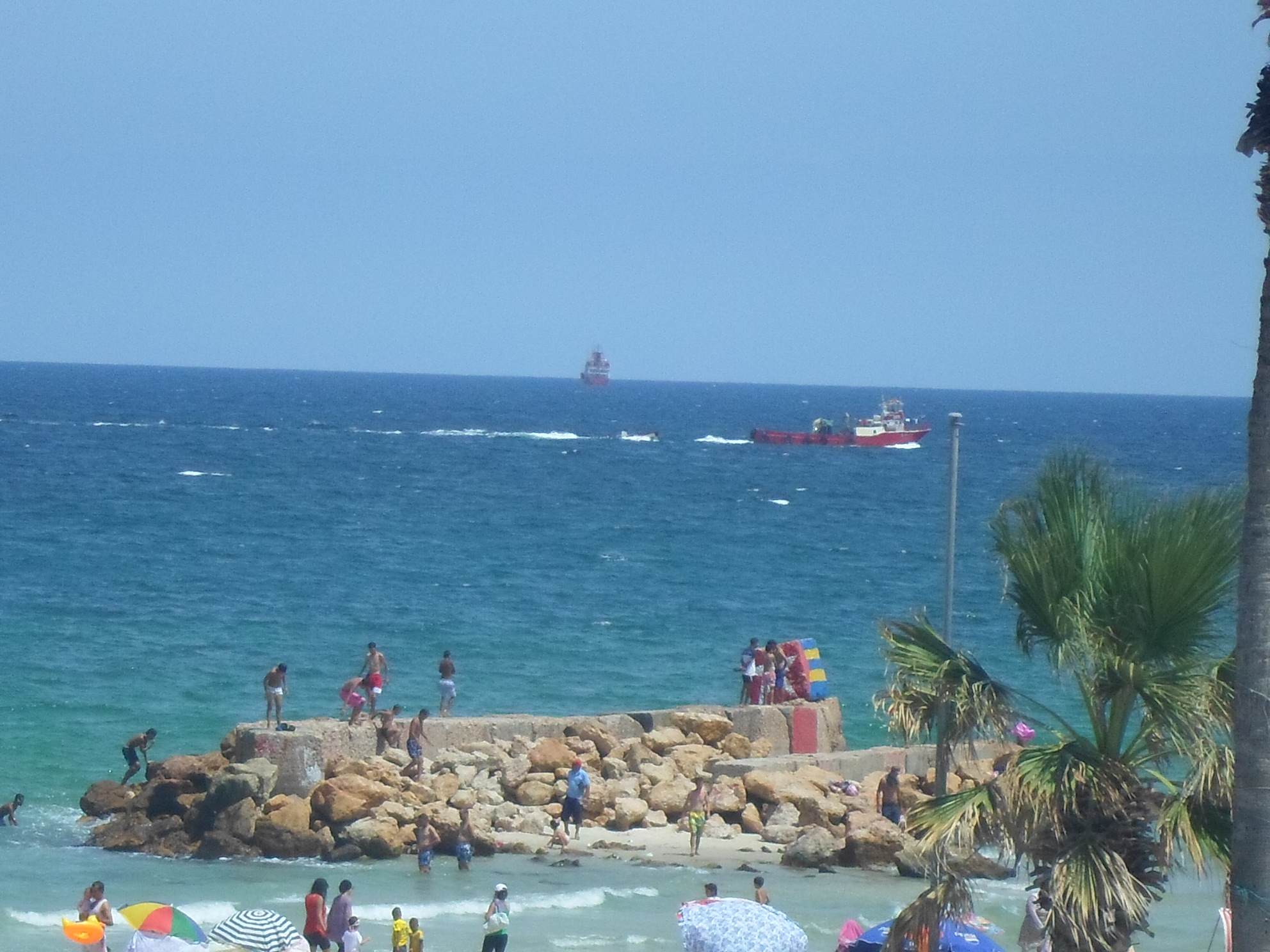

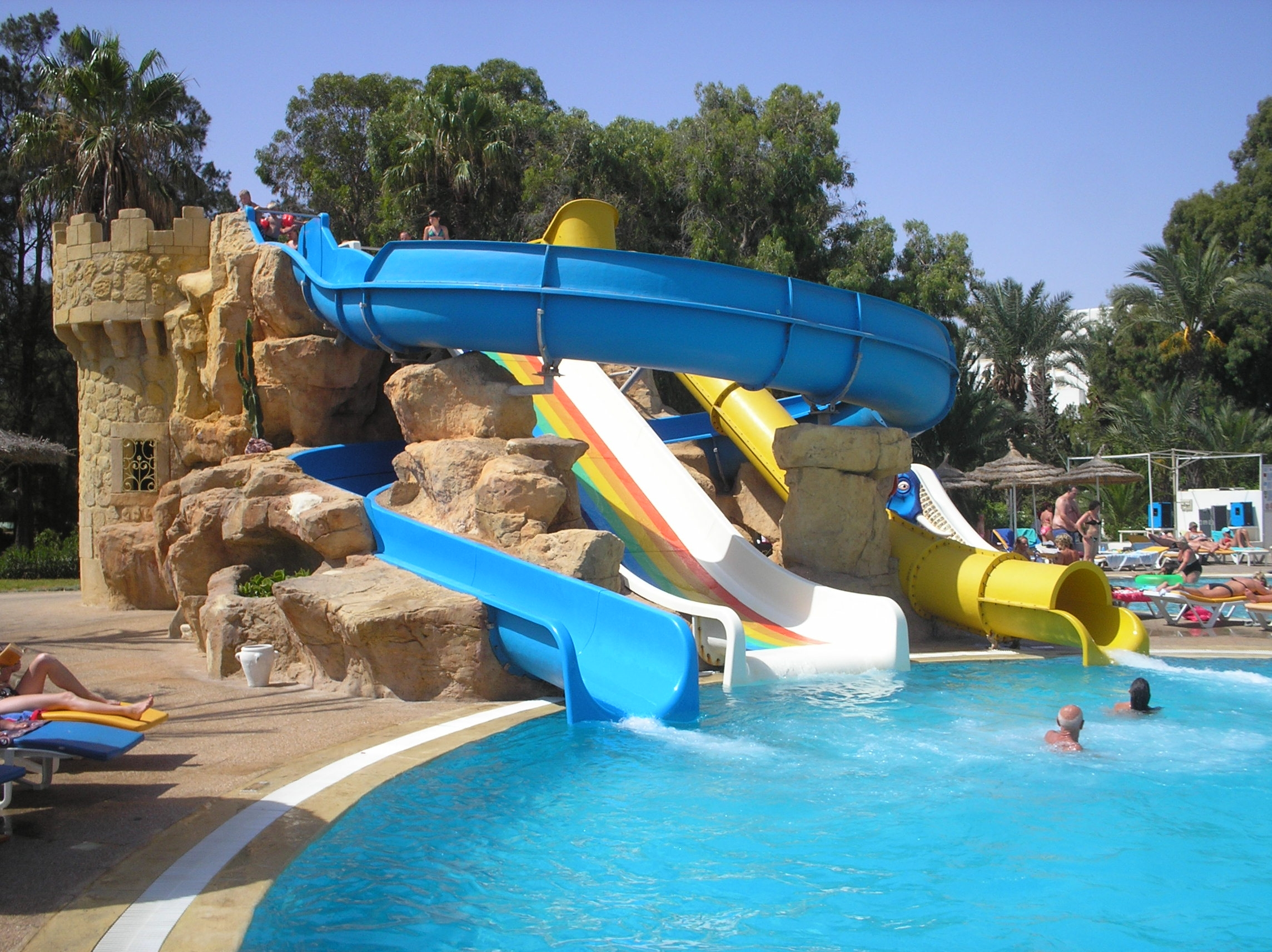

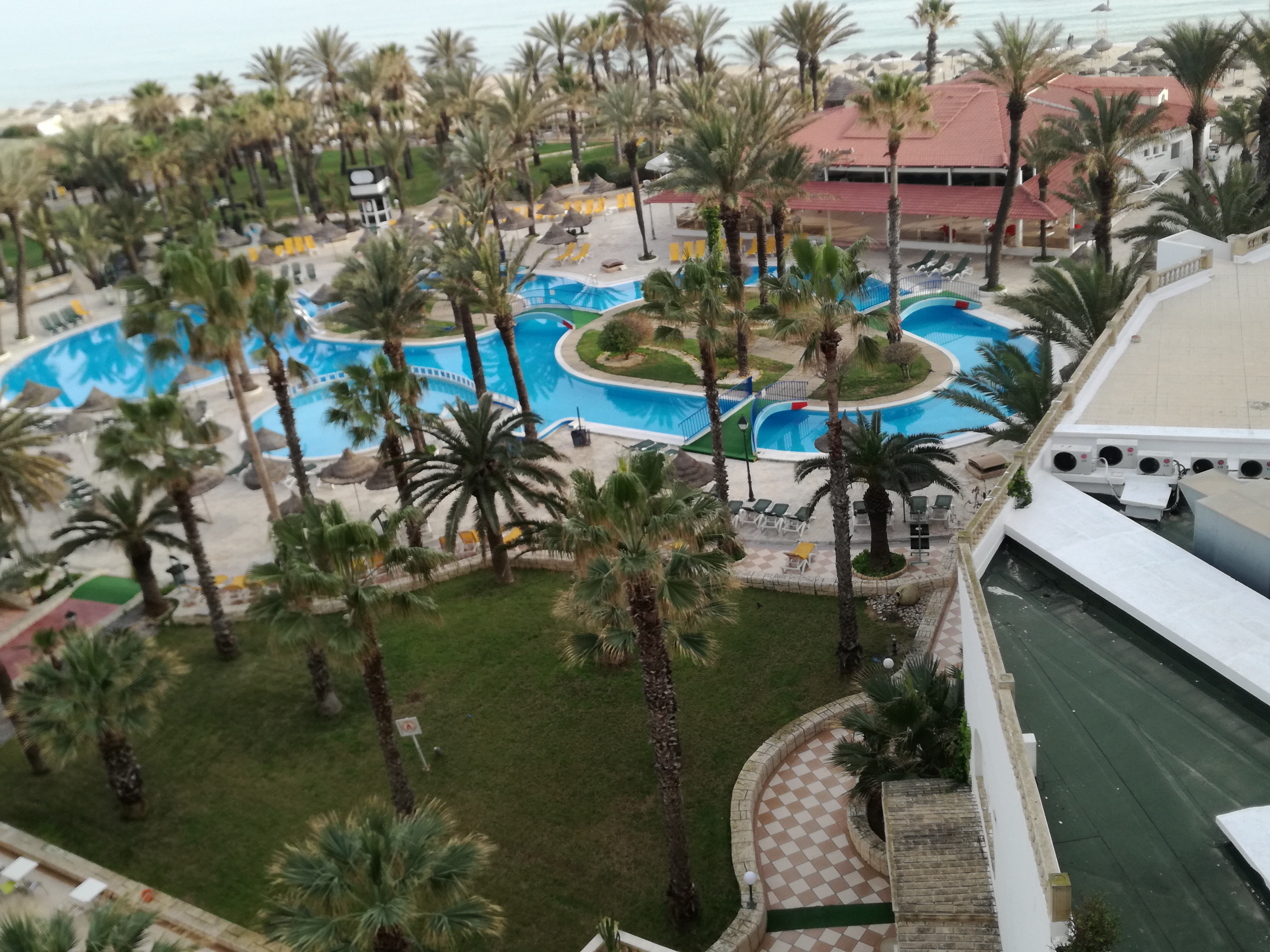

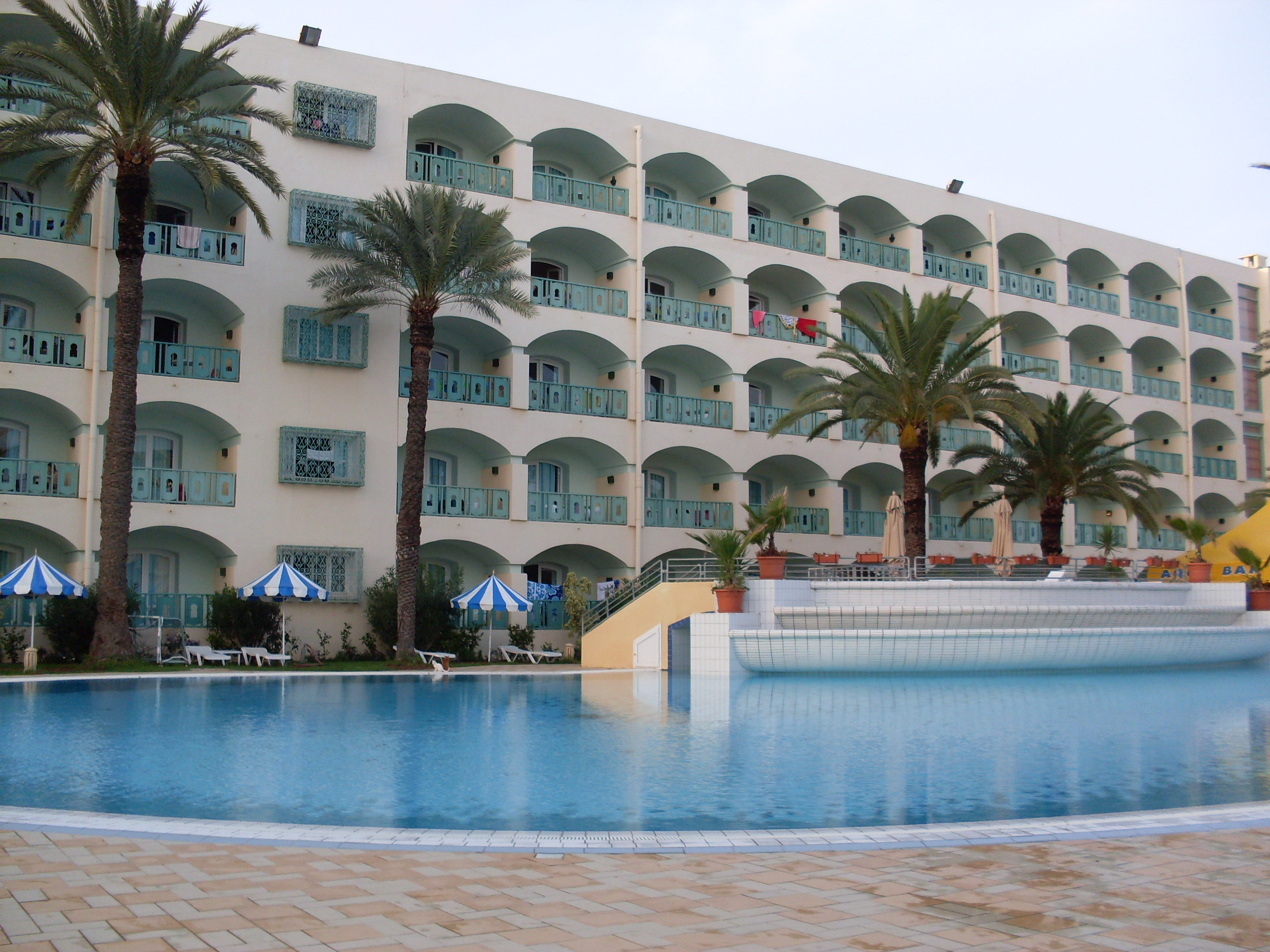

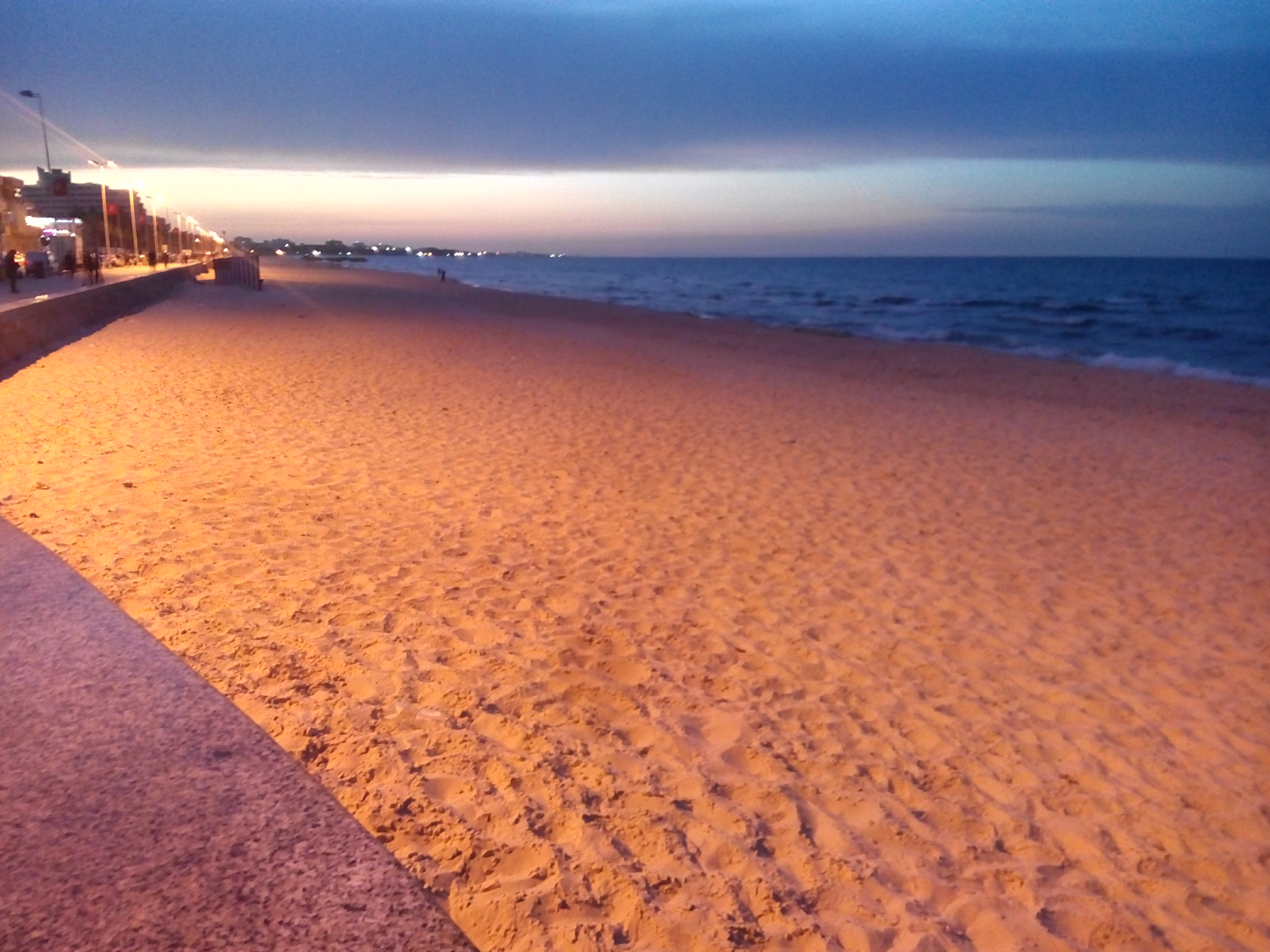

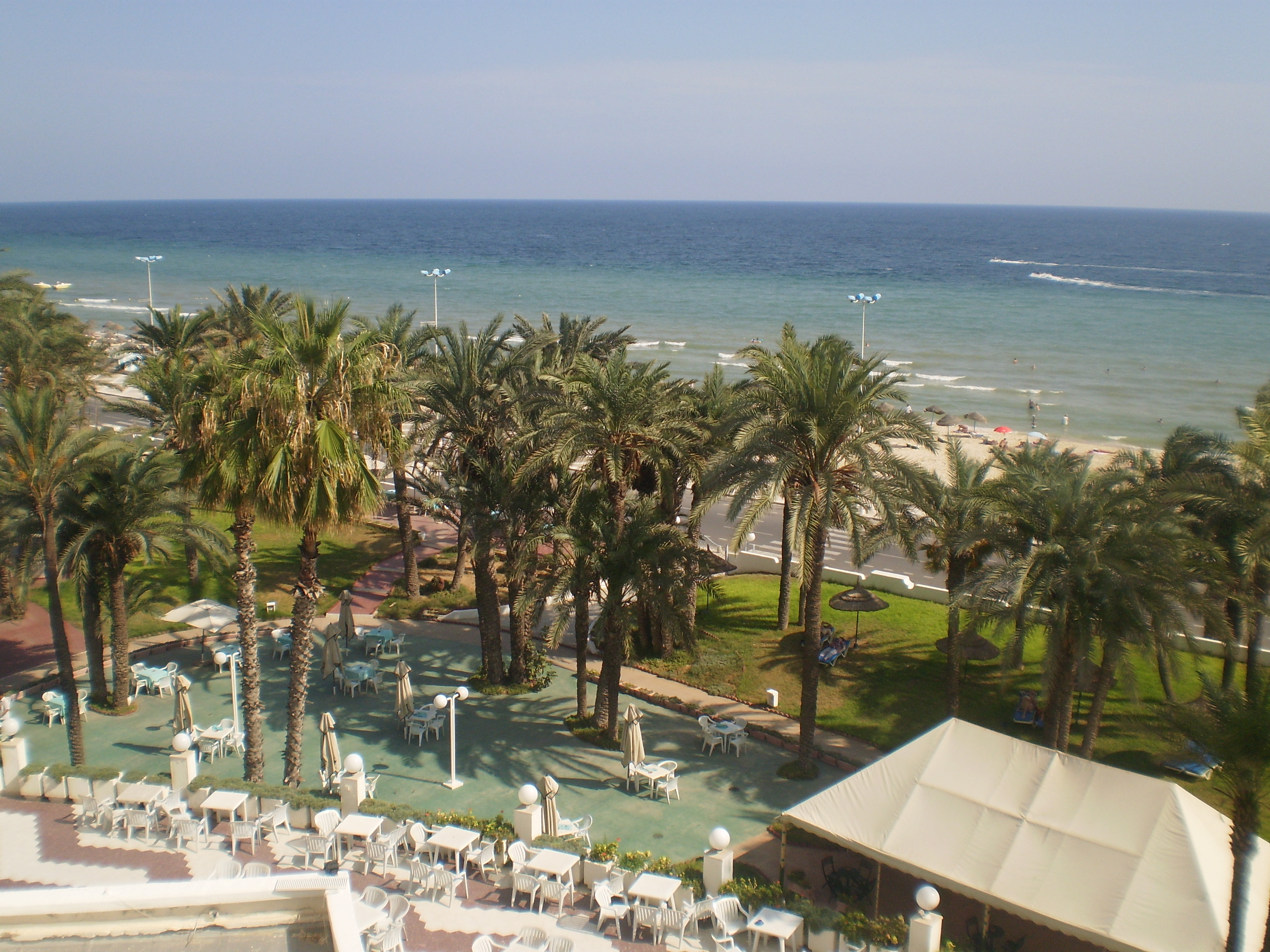
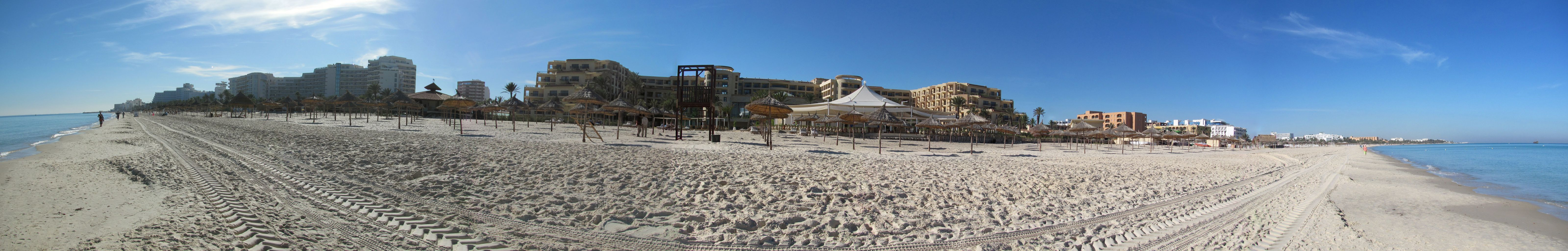
Paranoma of Sousse beach

== Transport ==
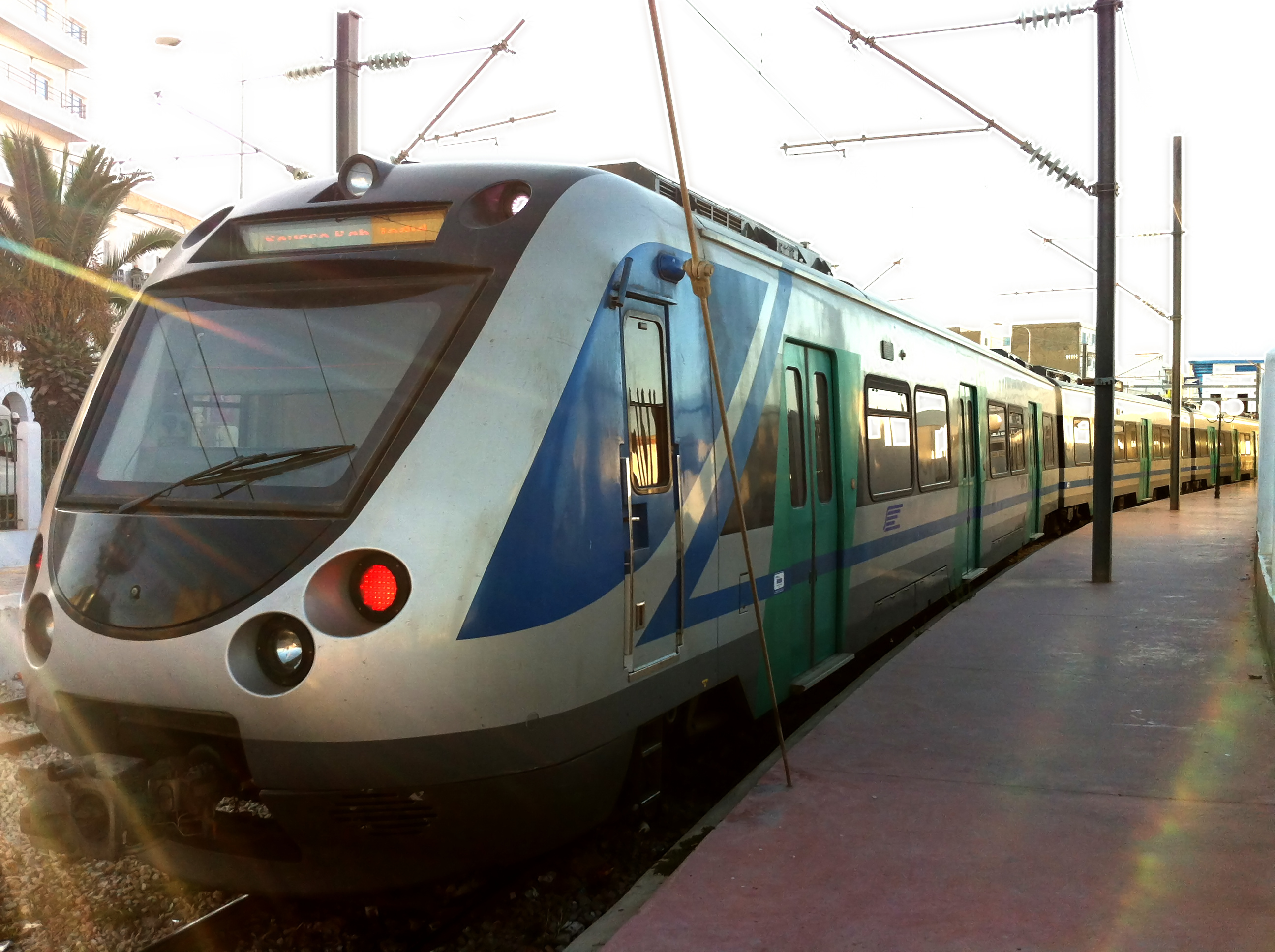
Sahel Metro train in Sousse

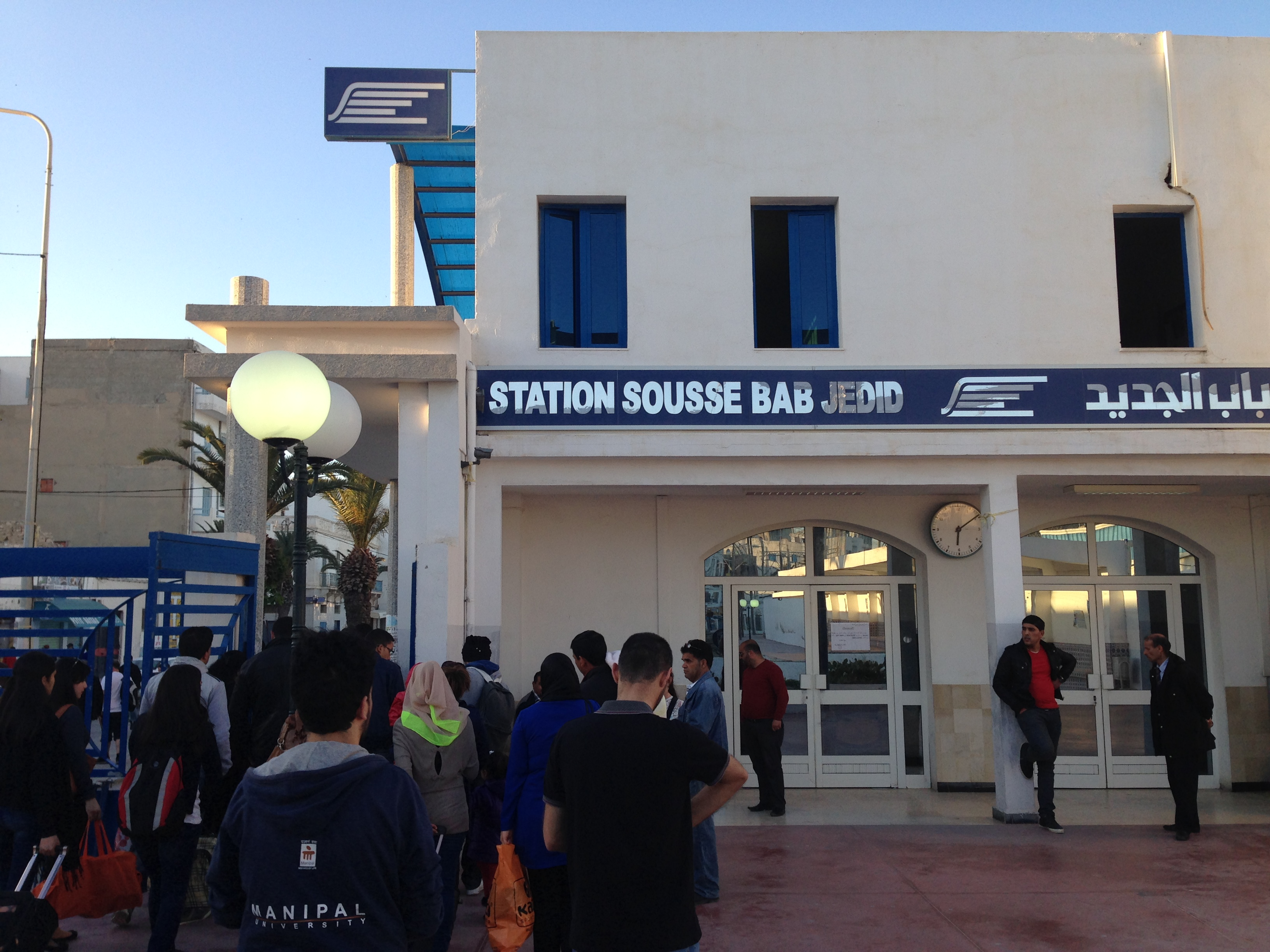
Sousse-Bab Jedid station.

Sousse is well-connected with the main Tunisian Railways network, having non-electrified lines to Tunis (since 1899), Sfax (since 1911), and Kasserine (since 2004) with diesel multiple unit and locomotive-driven trains. The main Gare Sousse terminus is in the city center, while Gare Kalaa Seghira serves a bypass route.

Since 2010 the electrified Sahel Metro line goes south to Monastir Habib Bourguiba International Airport, Monastir, and Mahdia. This line has the Sousse - Bab Jadid station as its northern terminus in Sousse's city center, and 4 additional stations in the city.

Intercity buses and red-strip microbuses (so-called louages) connect Sousse with many cities in Tunisia. Urban transit in Sousse is served by routes of articulated and conventional buses, blue-strip louages, and cheap taxis. The 600 mm (1 ft 11 5/8 in) Sousse–Kairouan Decauville railway operated from 1882 to 1996, before it was regauged to 1,000 mm (3 ft 3 3/8 in) gauge.

== Sights ==
=== Medina ===
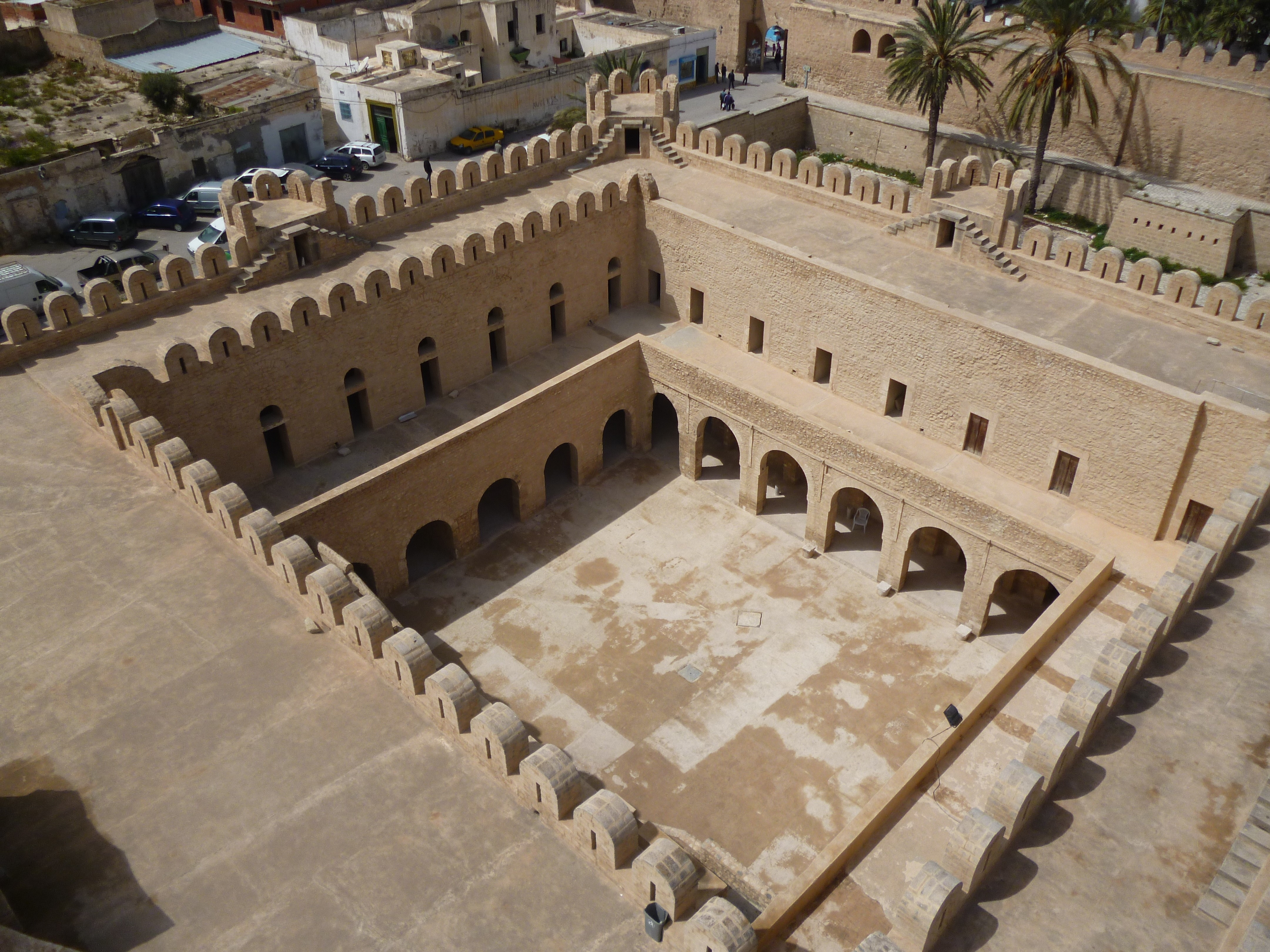
The ribat castle, in the Medina of Sousse

A medina, surrounded by its city walls and fortifications, is of historical interest. The medina includes open and covered bazaars (souks). Buildings of historical interest include the ribat castle, the central mosque, and a historical museum in the Casbah with mosaics from the area's many Roman villas. The Carthaginian catacombs can be visited.

UNESCO declared the medina of Sousse a World Heritage Site in 1988, citing among various things its preservation from modern development.

=== Port Kantaoui ===
The Kantaoui Port, is a touristic station in the form of a Port. It was built in 1979 specifically as a tourist center.

The architecture, although modern and dazzlingly white, has been modeled on the more traditional buildings in Tunisia, complete with narrow streets and arches. The hotels that line the beachfront extend from Sousse itself along miles of sparkling clean sea to the harbor of Port El Kantaoui and to the north of the harbor.

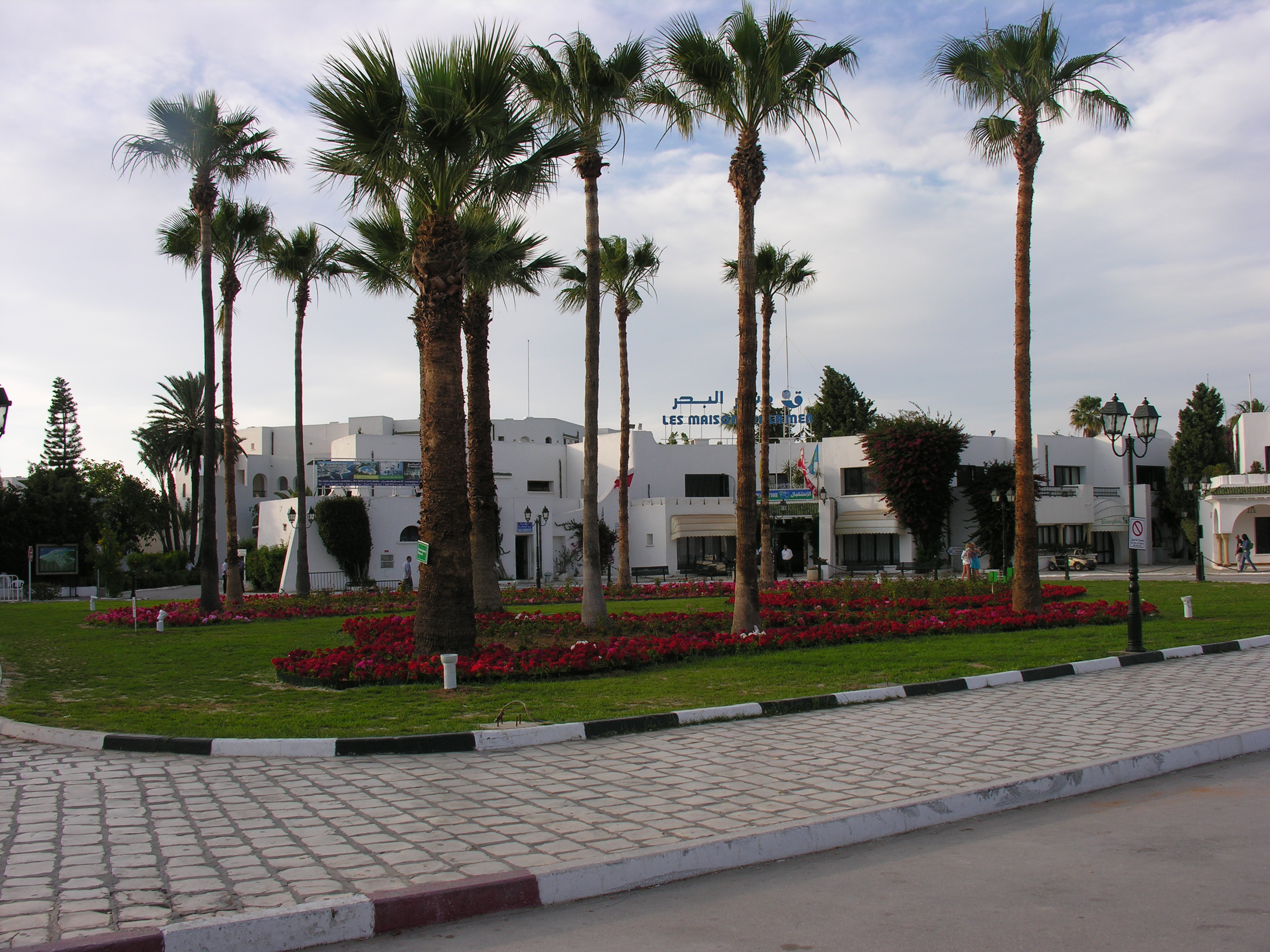

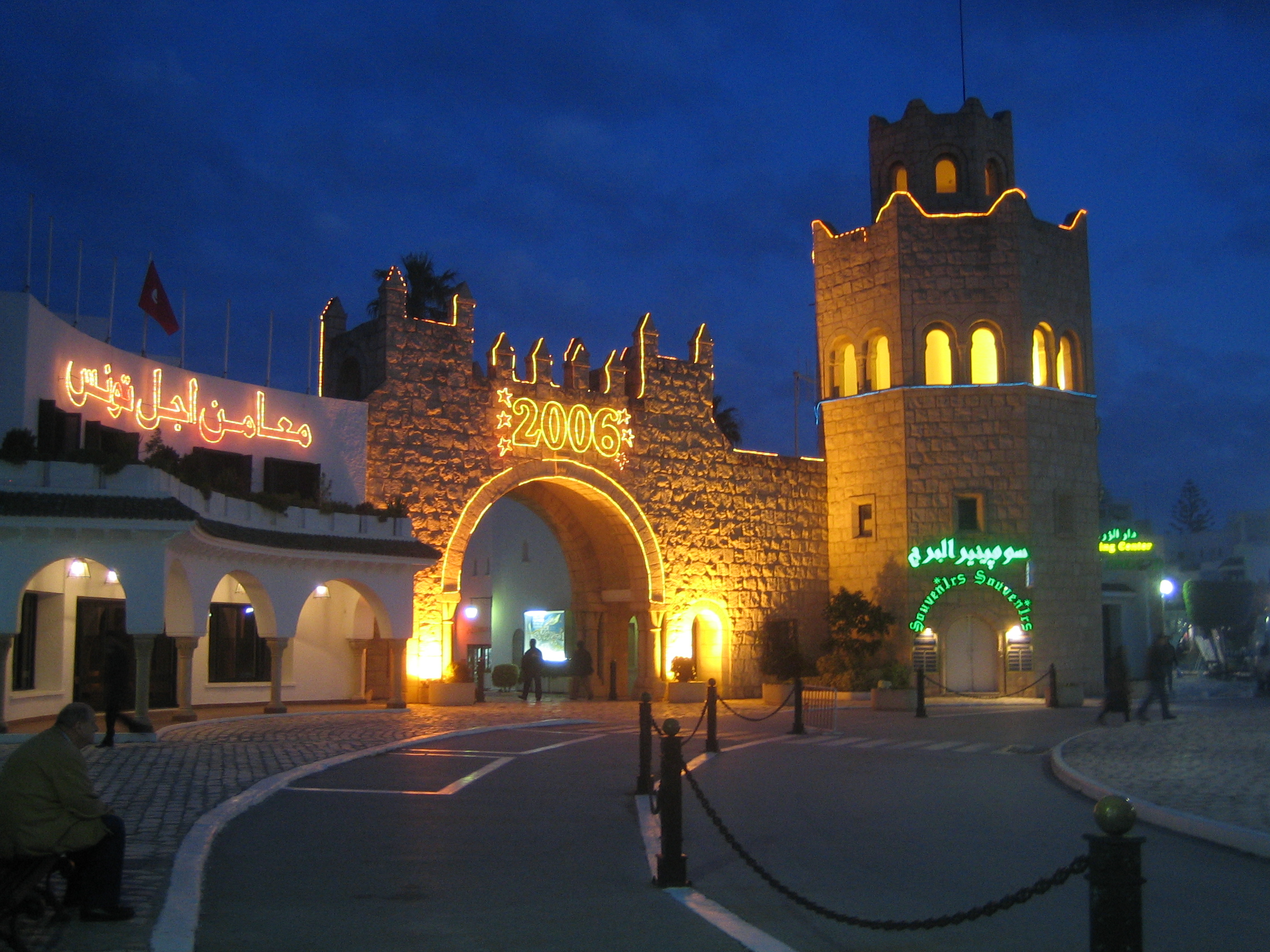

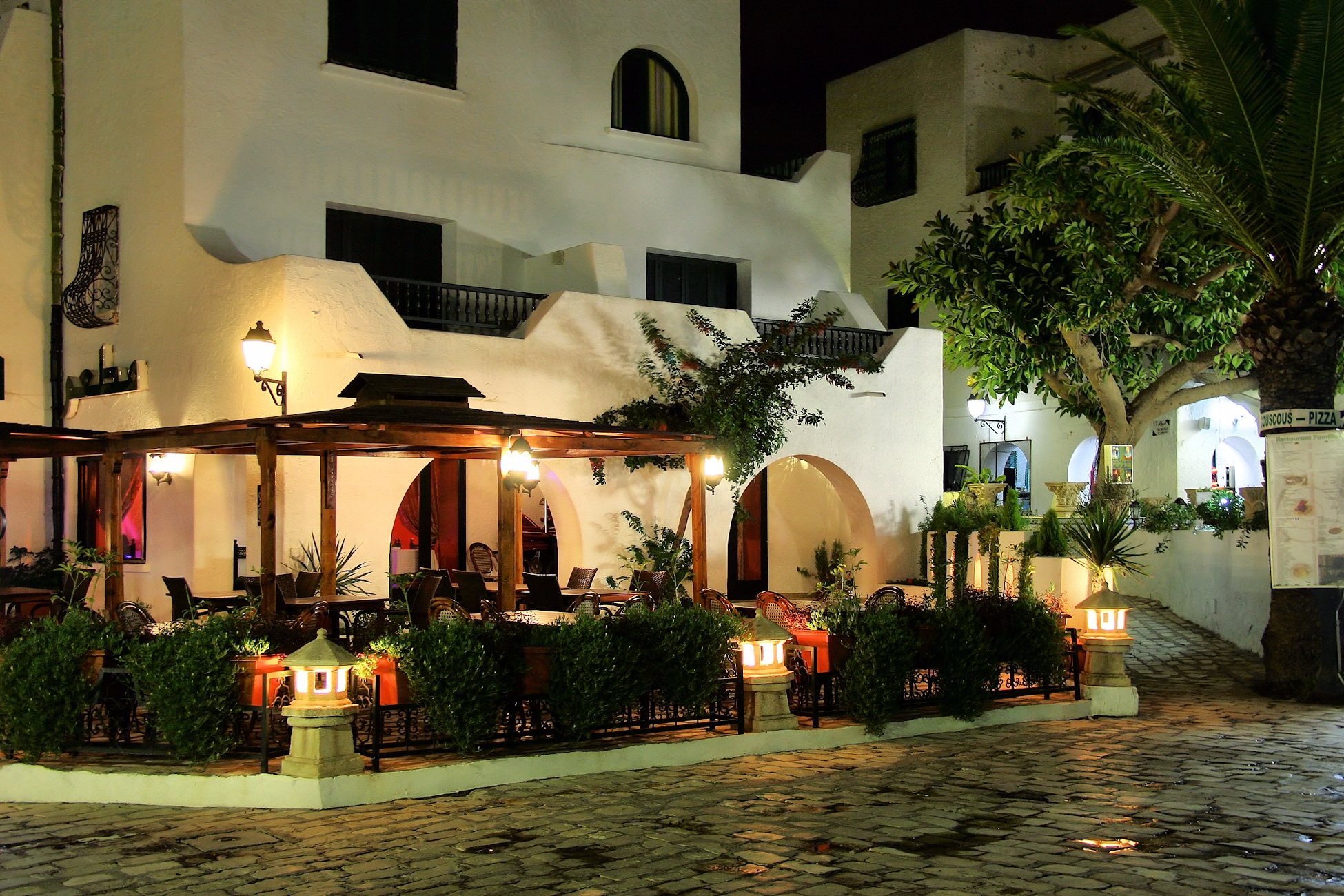

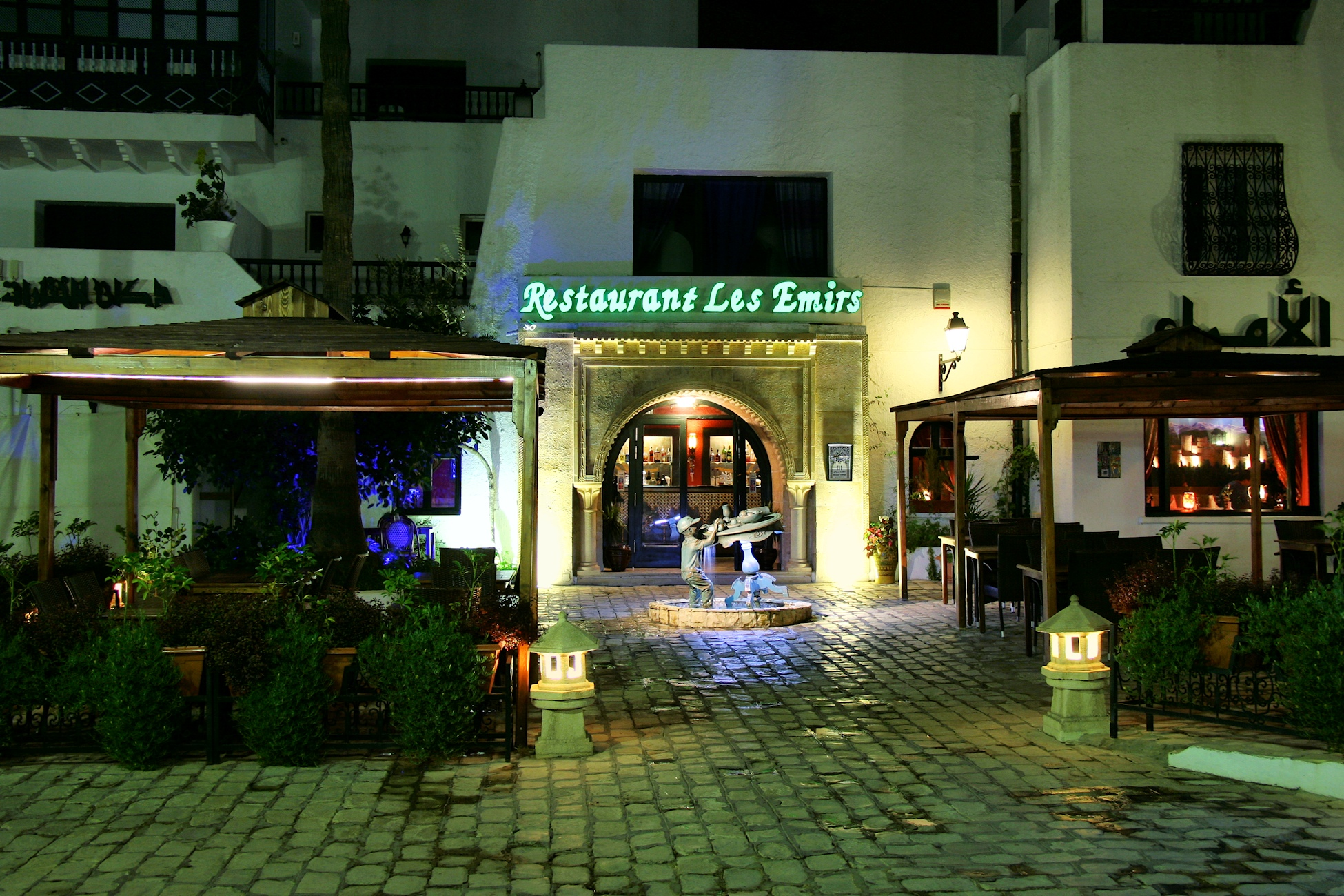

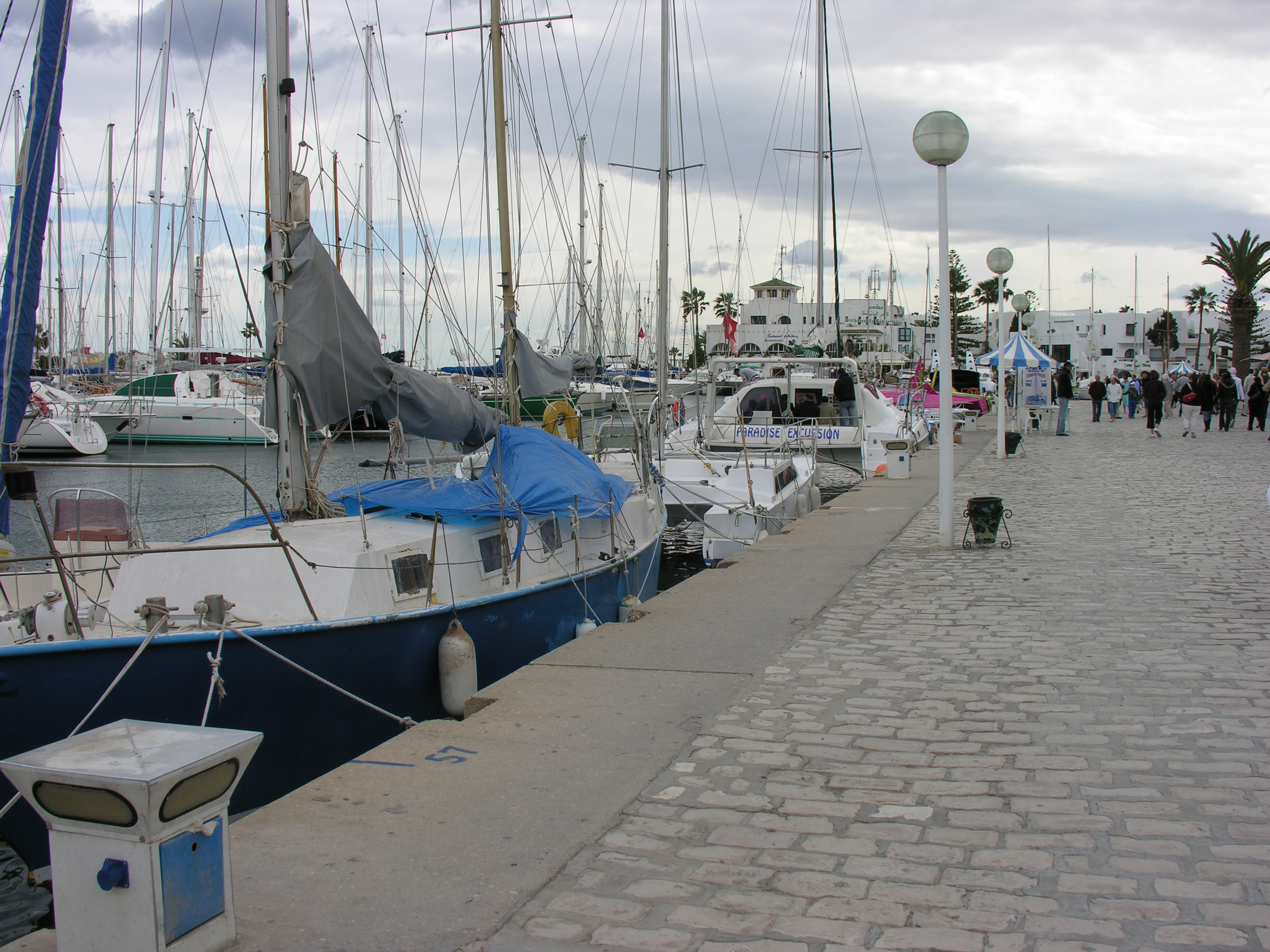

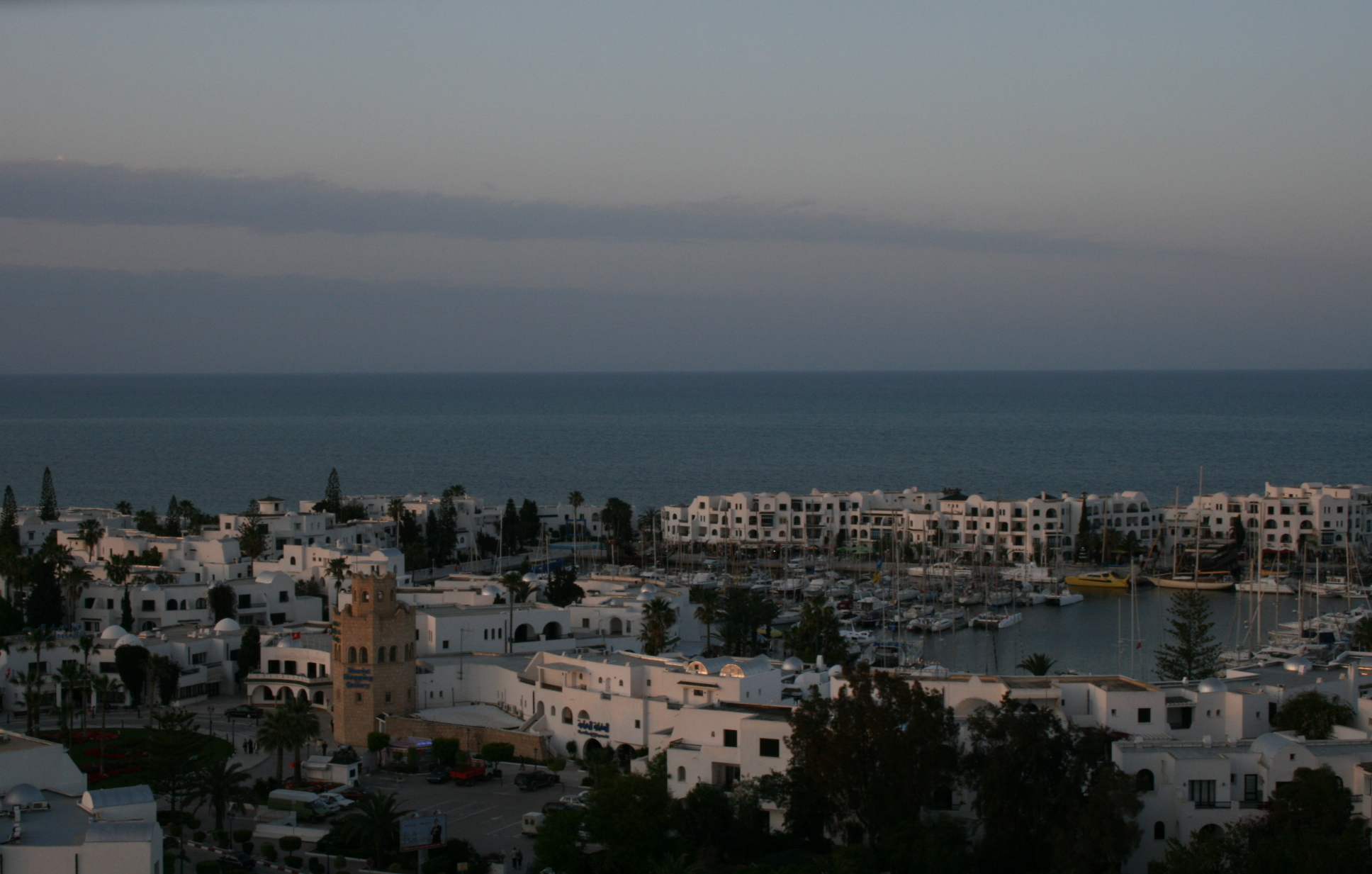

=== Religious buildings ===
==== Great Mosque ====
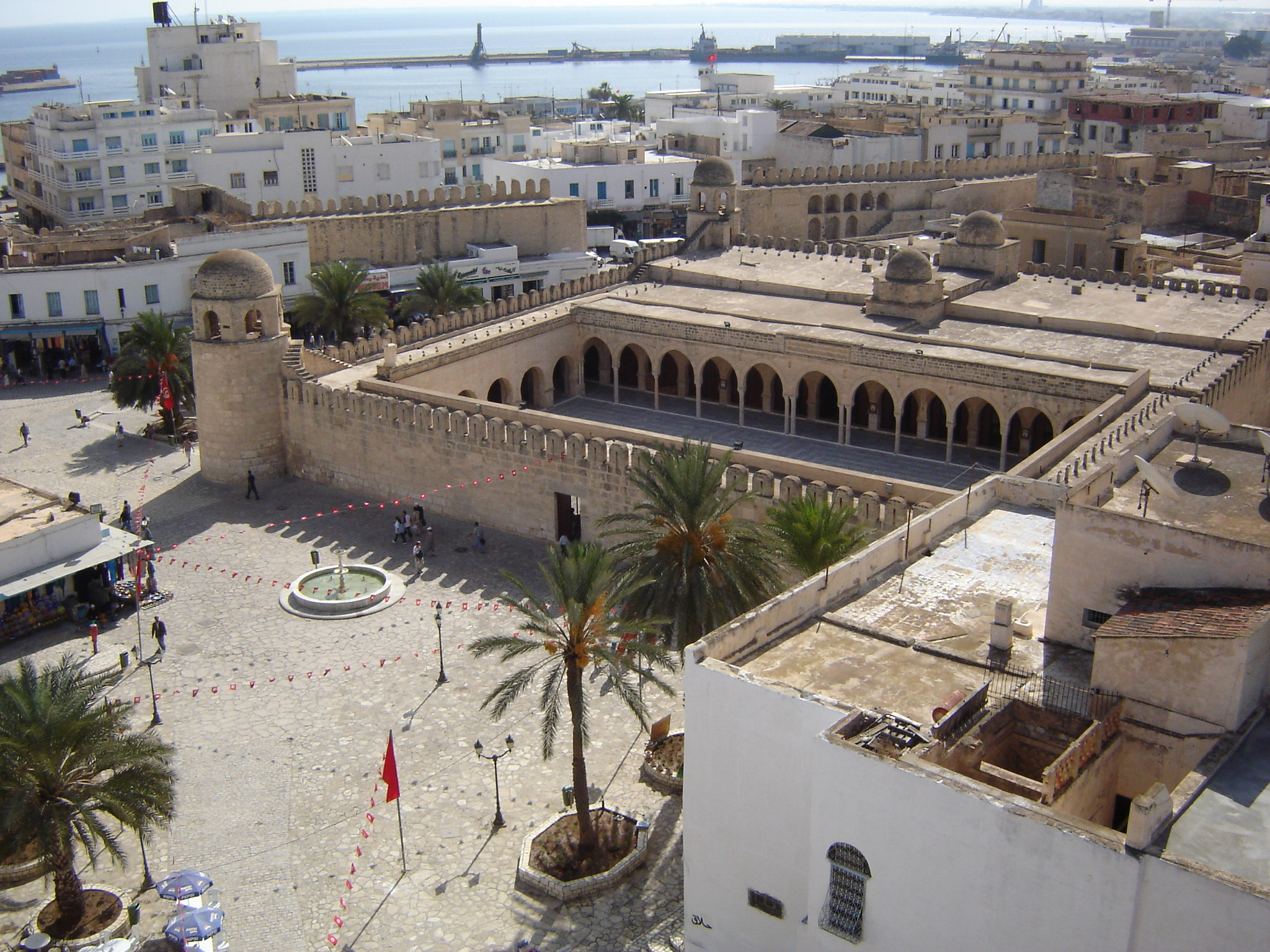
Grande Mosquée of Sousse

Located at the entrance to the medina, it was erected by the Aghlabid sovereign Aboul Abbas I (841–856) in 850–851, almost thirty years after the construction of the Ribat of Sousse. This mosque is the most emblematic of a city that became a few years after the reign of Ziadet-Allah I (817–838), the second city of Ifriqiya and the Sahel. Subsequently, the building is enlarged during the reign of Ibrahim II (875–902).

==== Other religious sights ====
- Bou Ftetah Mosque
- Médersa El Zaqqaq
- Église Saint-Félix
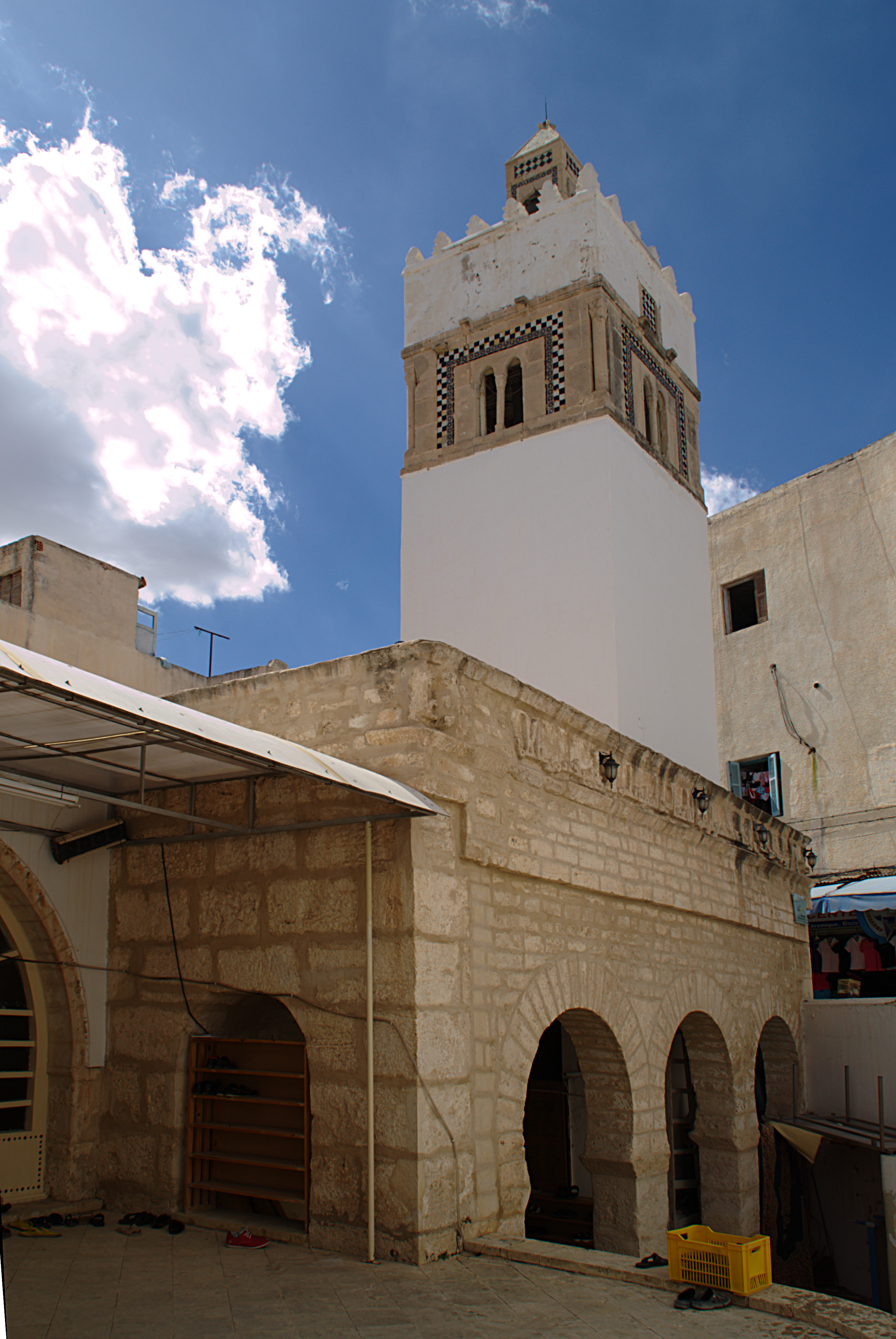
Mosquée Bou Fetatah

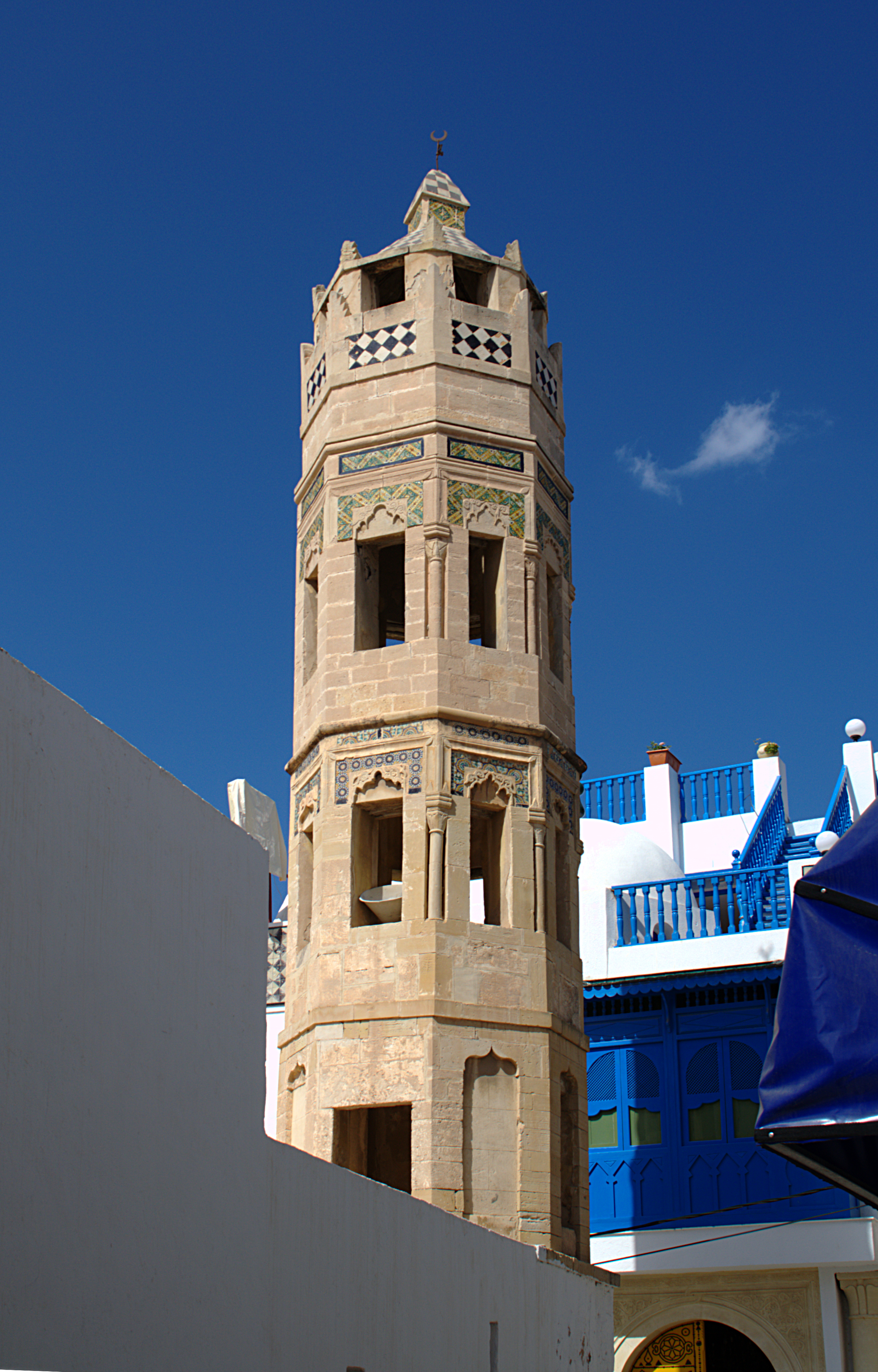
Minaret Al Zaqqaq

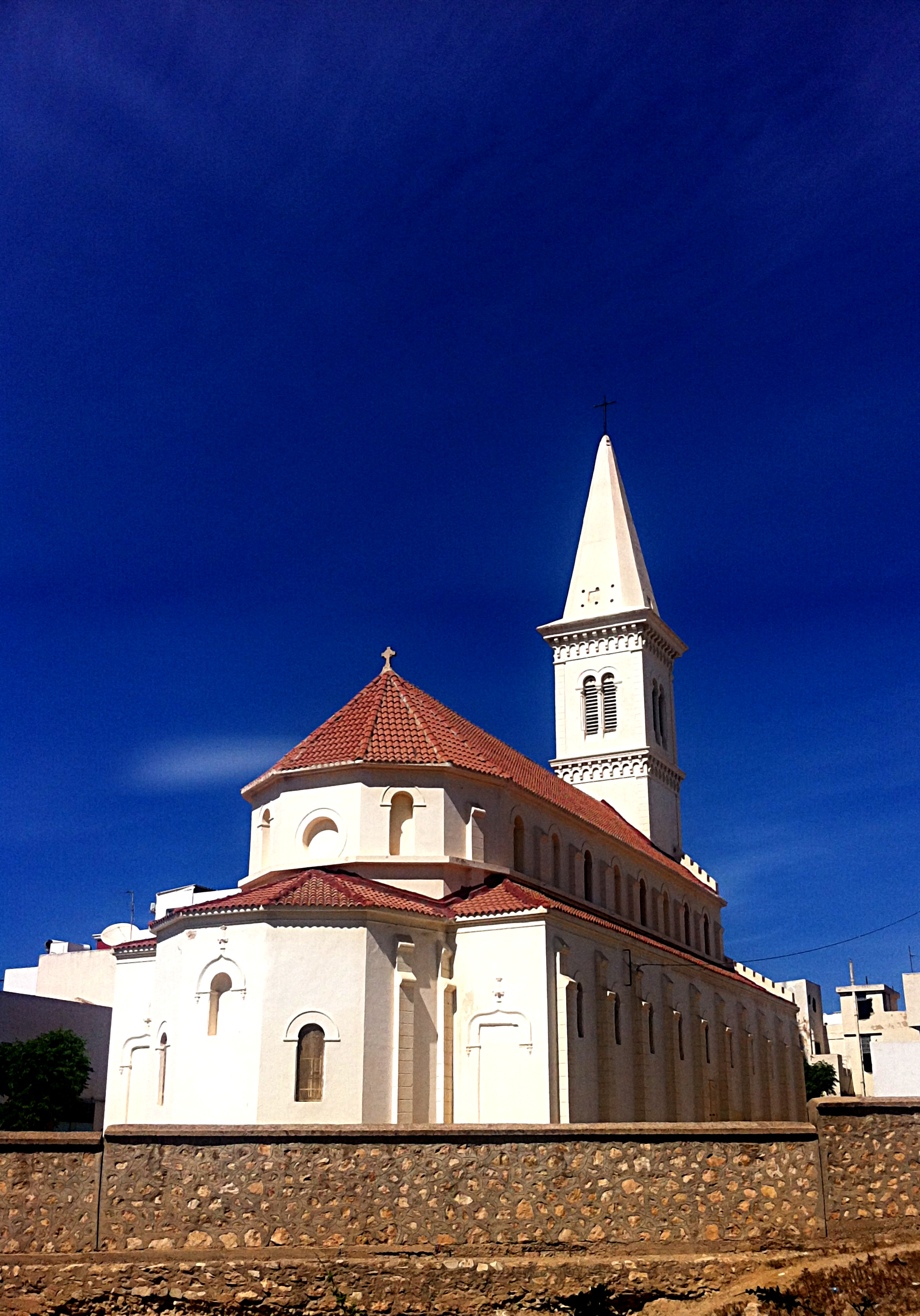
Saint Félix Cathedral

== Sport ==
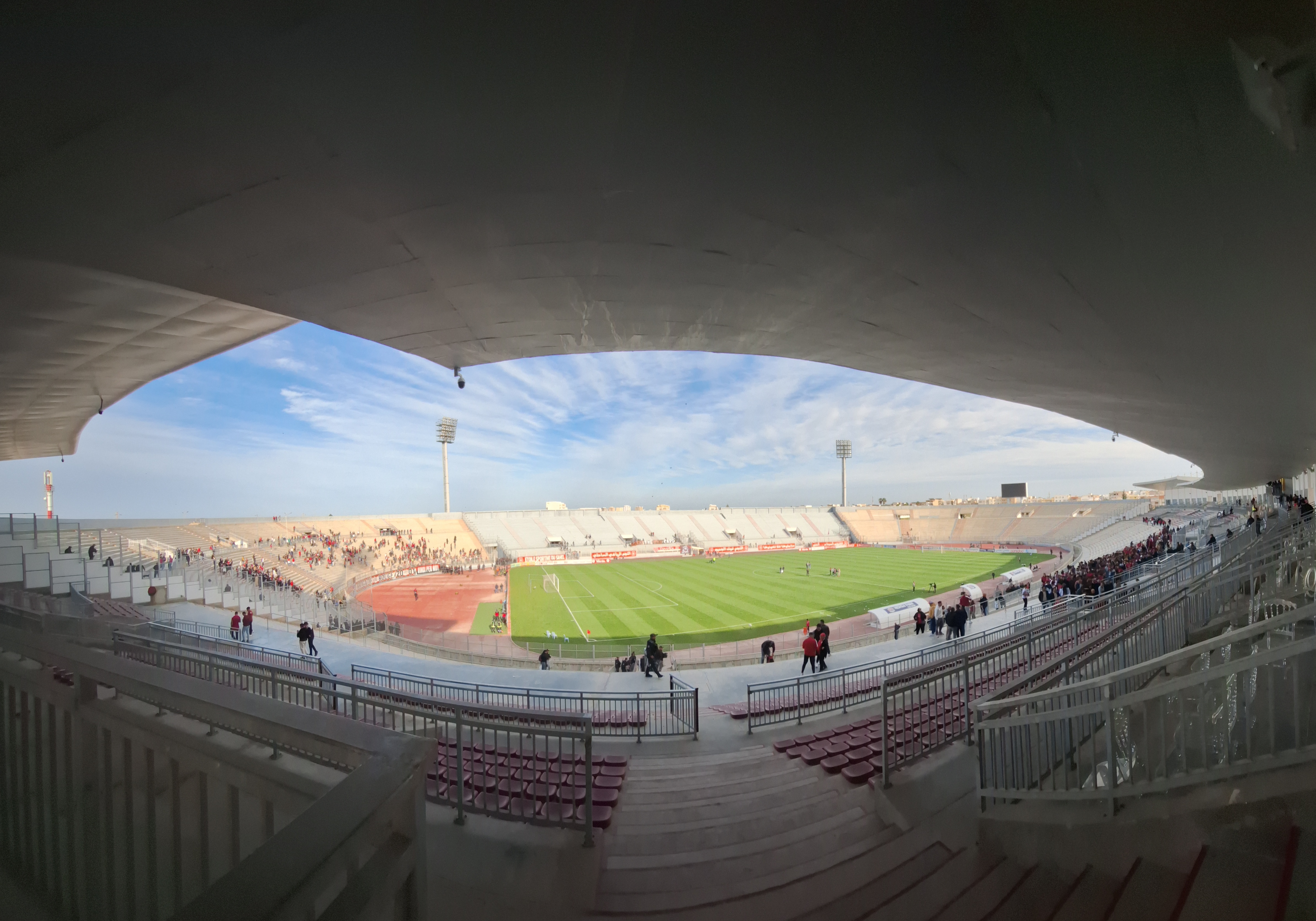
Stade Olympique de Sousse

Sousse is represented by Étoile Sportive du Sahel, a large multisport club. Football is the city's most popular sport, and ES Sahel has won the Tunisian football championship eleven times and the Tunisian Cup ten times. The team's home ground is Stade Olympique de Sousse. Handball, basketball, and volleyball are also popular.

== Climate ==
Köppen-Geiger climate classification system classifies Sousse's climate as hot semi-arid (BSh) bordering with hot-summer Mediterranean (Csa) and cool semi-arid (BSk).

The highest recorded temperature was 48 °C (118 °F) on 28 August 2007, while the lowest recorded temperature was 4.5 °C (40.1 °F) on 27 December 1993.

Climate data for Sousse
Month	Jan	Feb	Mar	Apr	May	Jun	Jul	Aug	Sep	Oct	Nov	Dec	Year
Record high °C (°F)	27 (81)	30 (86)	37 (99)	36 (97)	43 (109)	47 (117)	47 (117)	48 (118)	42 (108)	40 (104)	31 (88)	30 (86)	48 (118)
Mean daily maximum °C (°F)	15.8 (60.4)	16.3 (61.3)	17.8 (64.0)	20.2 (68.4)	23.4 (74.1)	27.1 (80.8)	30.7 (87.3)	31.5 (88.7)	30.2 (86.4)	25.6 (78.1)	20.8 (69.4)	16.7 (62.1)	23.0 (73.4)
Daily mean °C (°F)	11.4 (52.5)	11.7 (53.1)	13.3 (55.9)	15.6 (60.1)	18.7 (65.7)	22.4 (72.3)	25.6 (78.1)	26.2 (79.2)	25.0 (77.0)	20.9 (69.6)	16.1 (61.0)	12.4 (54.3)	18.3 (64.9)
Mean daily minimum °C (°F)	7.2 (45.0)	7.4 (45.3)	8.9 (48.0)	11.0 (51.8)	14.1 (57.4)	17.8 (64.0)	20.6 (69.1)	20.9 (69.6)	19.9 (67.8)	16.3 (61.3)	11.5 (52.7)	8.1 (46.6)	13.6 (56.6)
Record low °C (°F)	4.8 (40.6)	5 (41)	5.5 (41.9)	5.5 (41.9)	9 (48)	13 (55)	14 (57)	16 (61)	15 (59)	7 (45)	5.5 (41.9)	4.5 (40.1)	4.5 (40.1)
Average rainfall mm (inches)	43 (1.7)	48 (1.9)	35 (1.4)	28 (1.1)	15 (0.6)	9 (0.4)	2 (0.1)	7 (0.3)	35 (1.4)	44 (1.7)	35 (1.4)	53 (2.1)	354 (14.1)
Average rainy days	7	6	7	6	5	2	1	2	4	6	6	7	59
Mean daily sunshine hours	6	7	7	8	10	11	12	11	9	7	7	6	8
Source 1: Climate-Data.org, Weather2Travel for rainy days and sunshine
Source 2: Voodoo Skies for record temperatures

Sousse mean sea temperature
Jan	Feb	Mar	Apr	May	Jun	Jul	Aug	Sep	Oct	Nov	Dec
16 °C (61 °F)	16 °C (61 °F)	16 °C (61 °F)	16 °C (61 °F)	18 °C (64 °F)	21 °C (70 °F)	24 °C (75 °F)	26 °C (79 °F)	25 °C (77 °F)	23 °C (73 °F)	21 °C (70 °F)	18 °C (64 °F)

== Notable people ==
- Ons Jabeur, professional tennis player
- Salvius Julianus or Julian the Jurist, a master jurist, public official, and politician who served in the Roman imperial state under four successive emperors.
- Primasius of Hadrumetum, Roman bishop and exegete, noted for his Commentary on the Apocalypse
- Mohamed Ghannouchi, former prime minister
- Hamadi Jebali, former prime minister
- Aymen Abdennour, footballer
- Makrem Ben Romdhane, basketball player
- Dov Alfon, author and journalist
- Marcel Dadi, guitarist who died in the TWA accident of 1996.
- Zine El Abidine Ben Ali former President
- Sleim Ammar, neuropsychiatrist and poet.
- Rihab Chaieb, opera singer, mezzosopran
- Mohamed Ali Nafkha, Footballer

== Twin towns – sister cities ==
Sousse is twinned with:

- Boulogne-Billancourt, France
- Braunschweig, Germany
- Constantine, Algeria
- İzmir, Turkey
- Latakia, Syria
- Ljubljana, Slovenia
- Marrakesh, Morocco
- Nice, France
- Thiès, Senegal
- Weihai, China

== Gallery ==
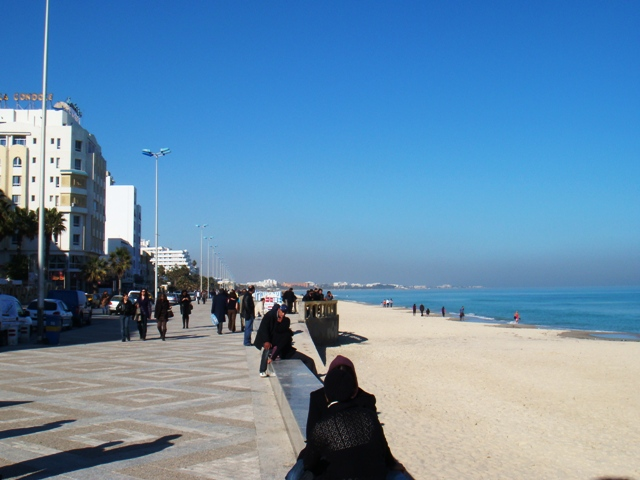

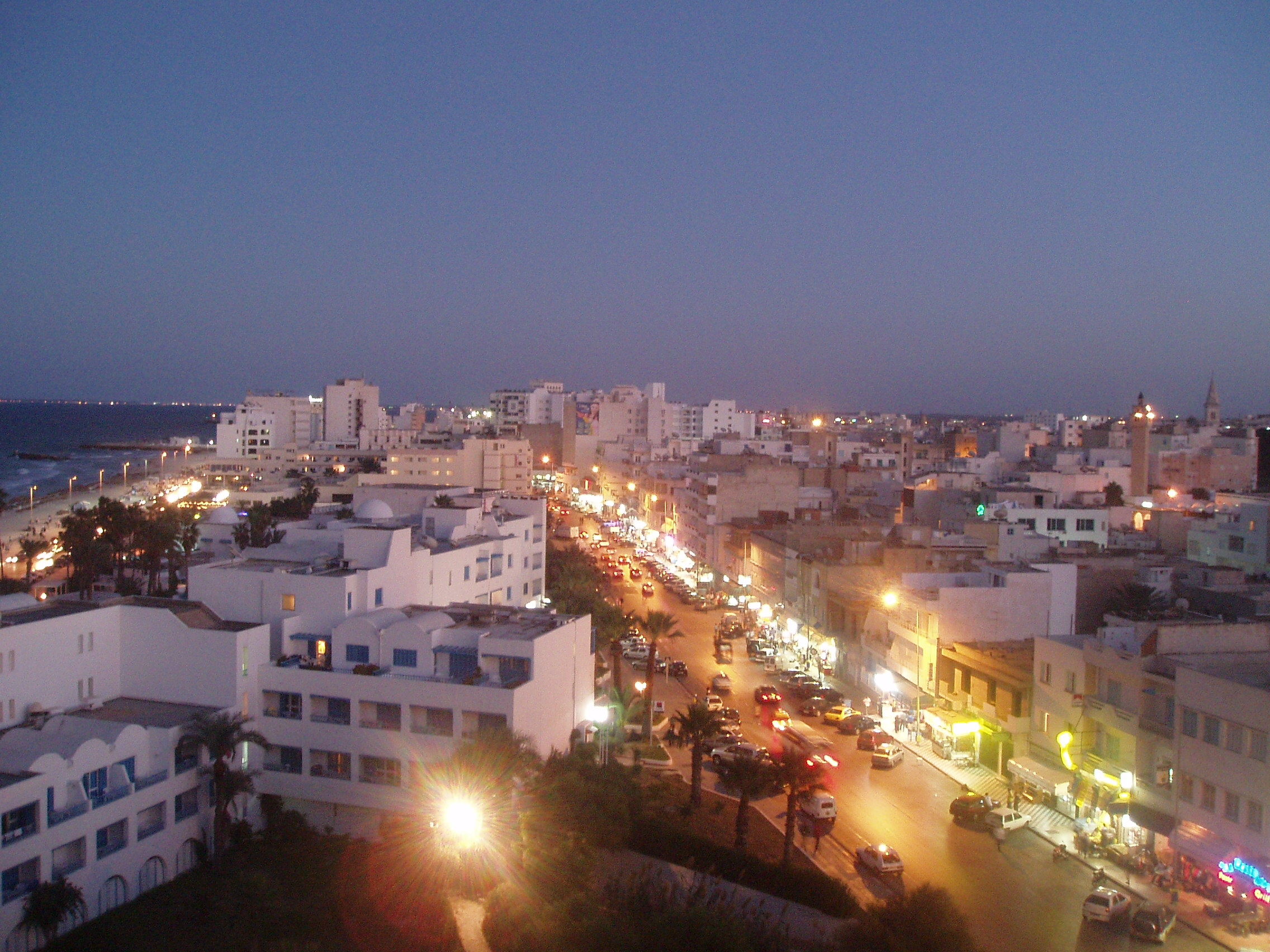

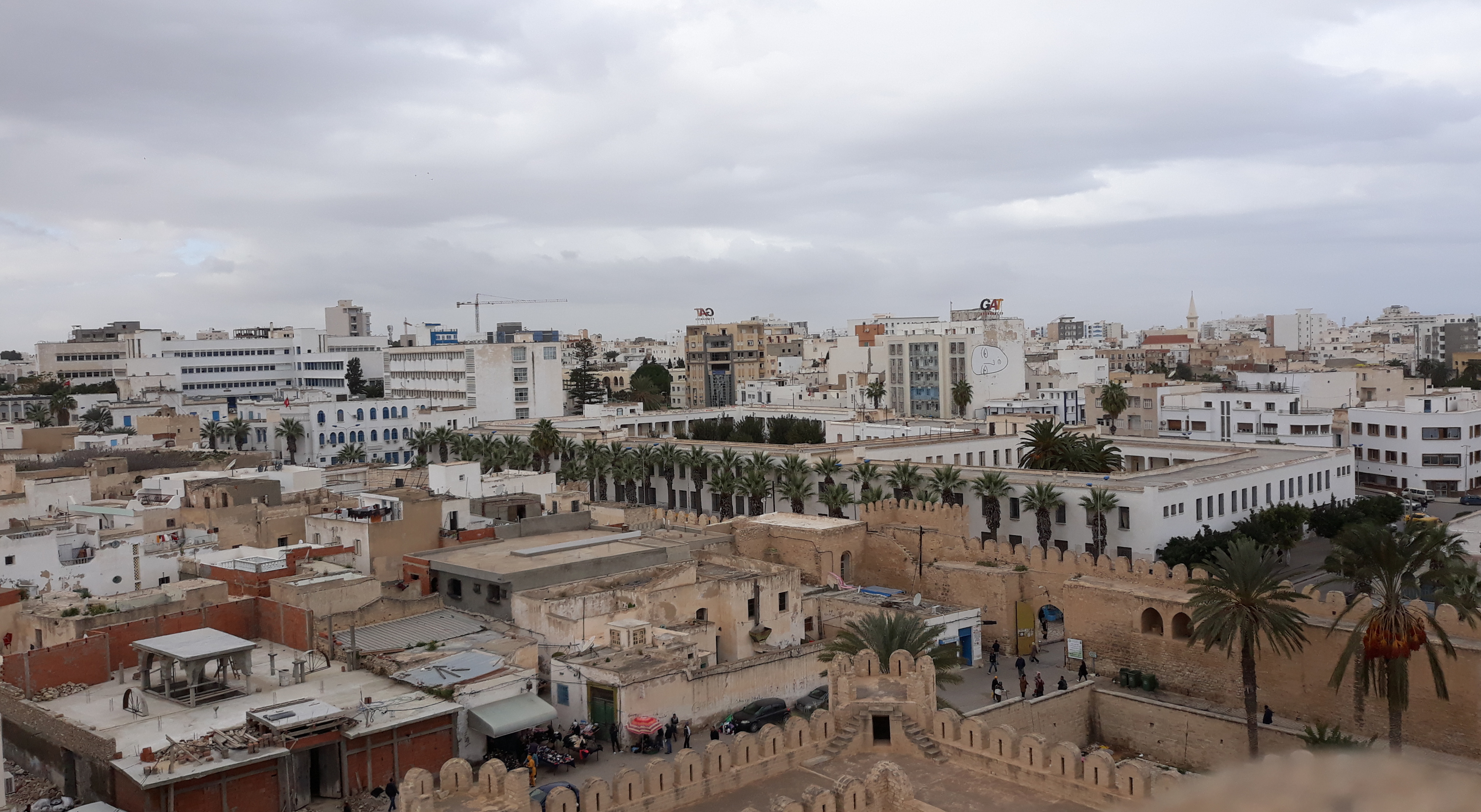

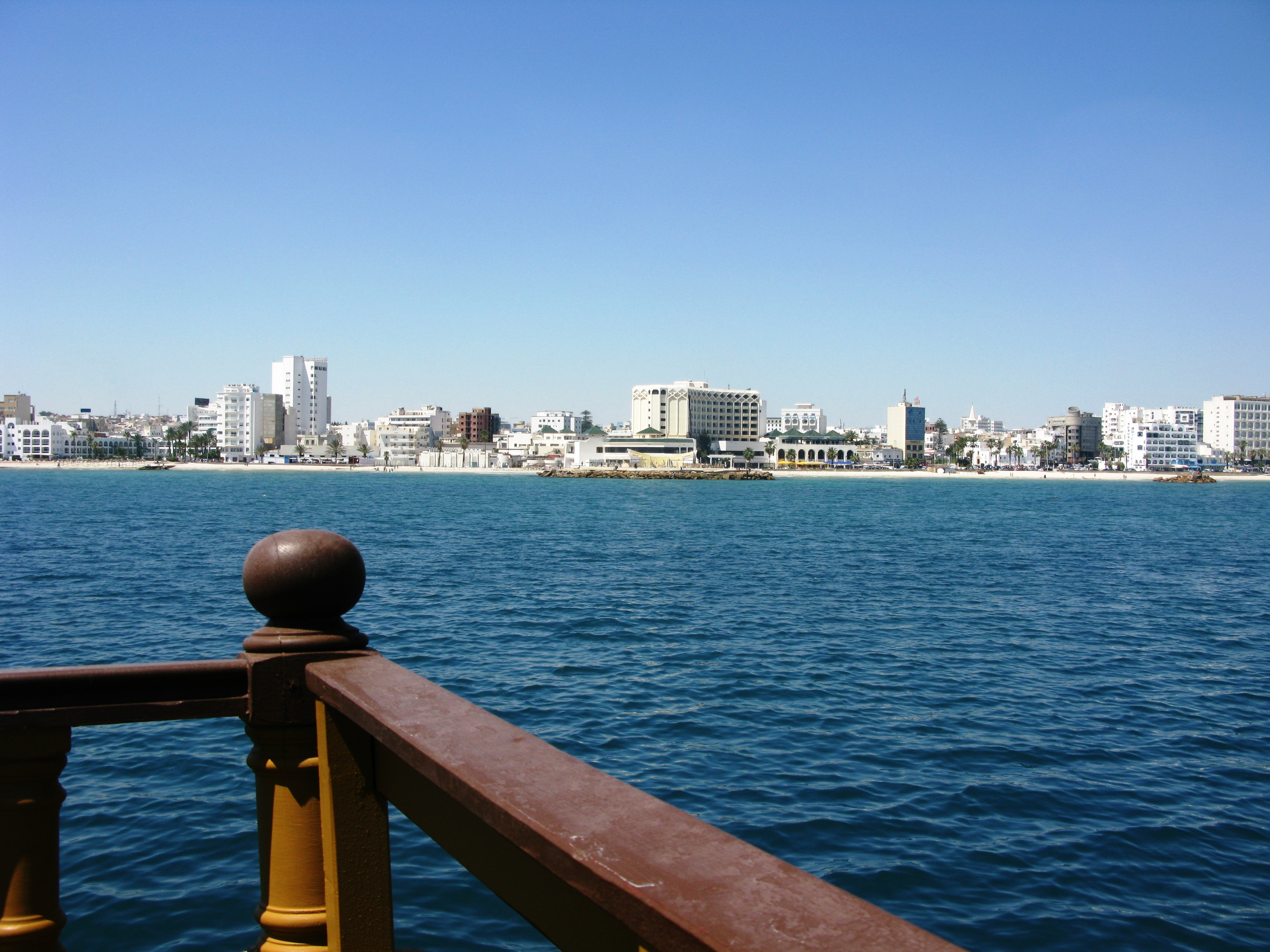

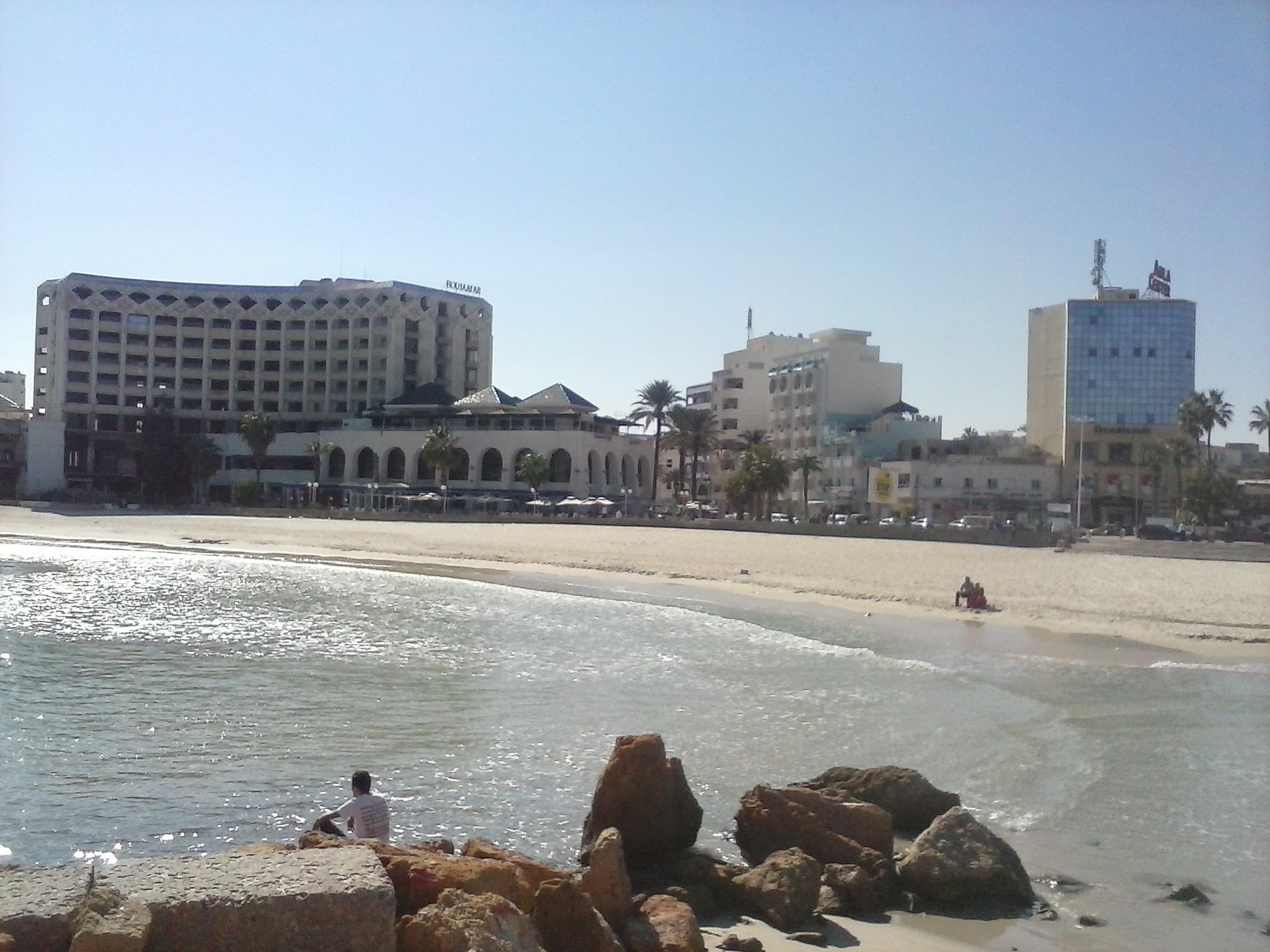

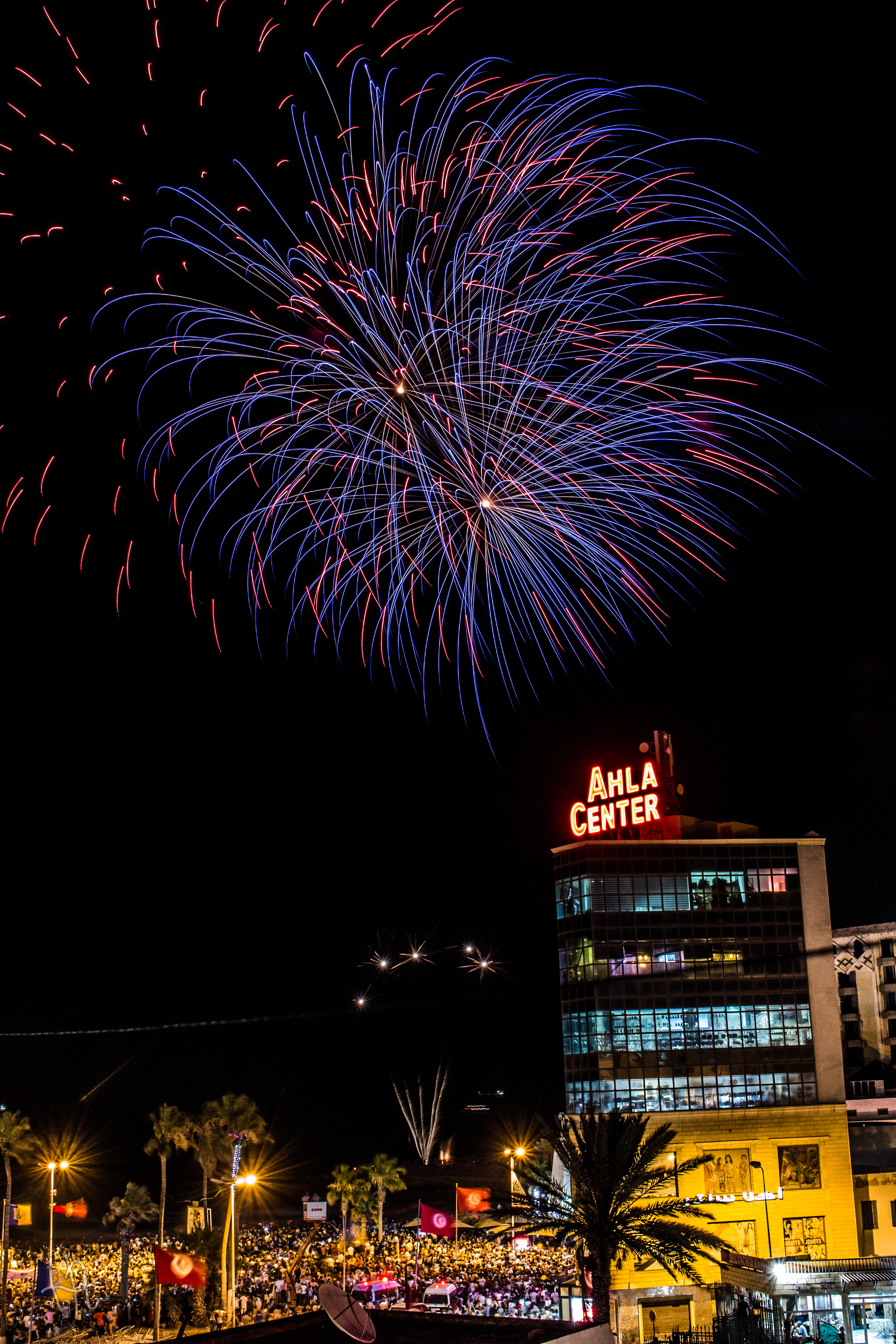

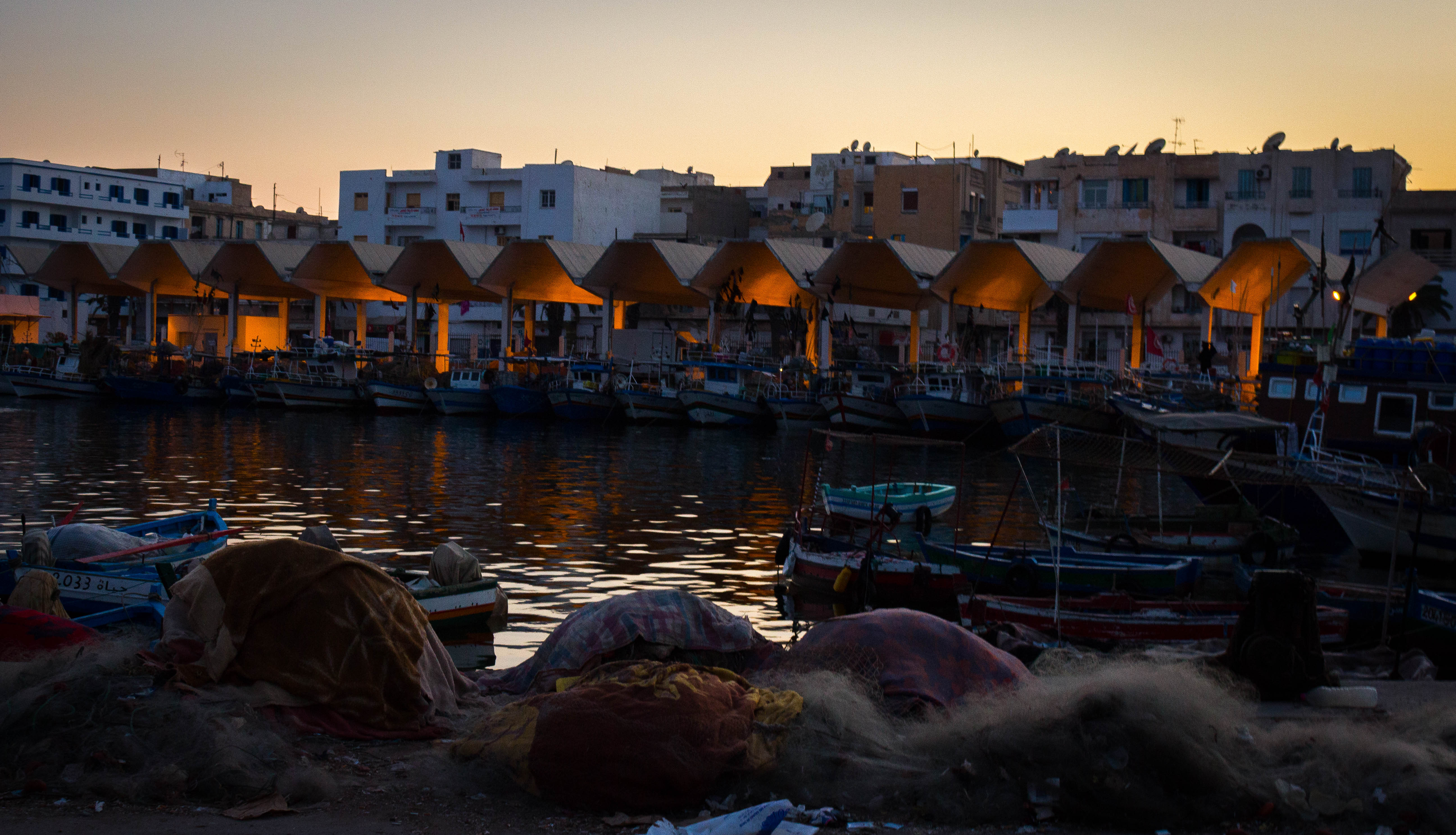

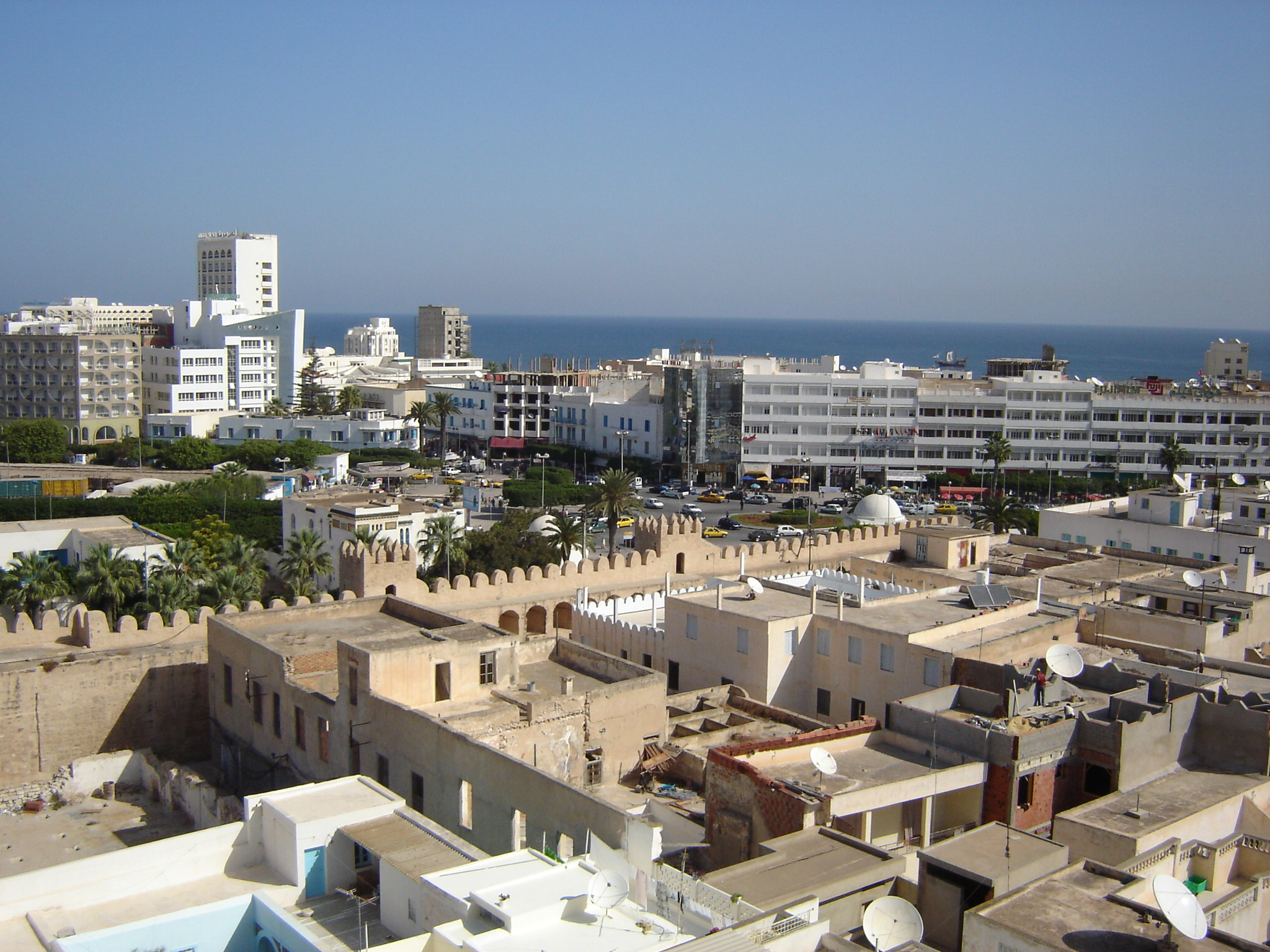
