= Sala =

Sala or SALA may refer to:

== Places ==
=== Europe ===
- Sala, the historical name of the river IJssel and home of the Salii Franks
- Sala (Estonian island), one of the Uhtju islands
- Sala Baganza, a municipality in Emilia-Romagna, Italy
- Sala Bolognese, a municipality in Emilia-Romagna, Italy
- Sala Consilina, a municipality in Campania, Italy
- Sala Municipality, Latvia, a municipality in Latvia
- Sala, Sala Parish, a village in Latvia, an administrative centre of Sala municipality
- Šaľa, Slovakia, a city in Slovakia
- Sala Municipality, Sweden, a municipality in Sweden
- Sala, Sweden, a city in Sweden, seat of Sala Municipality
- Sala Parish (disambiguation), parishes (socken) in Sweden

=== Africa ===
- Salé (Berber languages: Sala), Morocco
- Sala, an ancient city at Rabat, Morocco
- Sala Colonia, a Phoenician and Roman colony whose ruins are in present-day Chellah, Morocco
- Sala River, the Roman name for the Bou Regreg

=== Asia ===
- Şələ, Azerbaijan
- Sala, Cambodia, village in Cambodia
- Sala, Iran, village in Kurdistan Province, Iran
- Sala, Cabuyao, barangay in the Philippines
- Sala, Lampang, village and sub district in northern Thailand
- Sala (Lydia), ancient town of Lydia, now in modern Turkey

== Buildings ==
- Śālā, any hall, house, shed or covered space in Indian architecture; also a school (salai, calai)
- Sala (Thai architecture), an open pavilion in the architecture of Thailand
- Sala Polivalentă (disambiguation)
- Sala Regia (disambiguation)
- Sala Stadium, a stadium in Ashkelon, Israel

== Other ==
- Cesare Sala, an Italian coachbuilder based in Milan
- Sala (given name)
- Sala (surname)
- South Australian Living Artists Festival, visual arts festival known as SALA
- Sal tree (Pali and Sanskrit "sāla")
- Salak (Salacca zalacca, translated from Thai as "sala"), a tree and its fruit, native to southeast Asia

== See also ==
- Salas (disambiguation)
- Salah (disambiguation)
- Salla (disambiguation)
- Sallah (disambiguation)
- Shala (disambiguation)
- I-sala, a type of Fijian headscarf or turban
- Salat, alternative spelling
- Saila, name
- Salar people, an ethnic group from China
