= Salas (disambiguation) =

Salas is a Spanish surname.

Salas may also refer to:

== Places ==
- Isla Salas y Gómez, island in the Polynesian Triangle
- Salas (Galiza), a river in Spain and Portugal
- Salas, Asturias, a municipality in Spain
  - Salas (parish) in the municipality
- Salas, Riga, a neighborhood in Riga, Latvia
- Salas District, Lambayeque, Peru
- Salas District, Ica, Peru
- Salaš (Uherské Hradiště District), a municipality and village in the Czech Republic
- Salaš (Zaječar), a village in Serbia
- Salaš Crnobarski, a village in Serbia
- Salaš Noćajski, a village in Serbia

== Other uses ==
- Salaš, a type of farm
- Salas language, an Austronesian language of Indonesia

== See also ==
- Sala (disambiguation)
- Salaš (disambiguation)
