= Salas =

Salas (Hebrew: סלאס), from Spanish ‘salas’ (rooms, halls), is a Spanish surname of Germanic and Jewish origin, and a common family name in the Spanish-speaking world. It is ranked amongst the most common surnames found in Costa Rica and in Mexico.

The surname is also associated with Sephardic Jews who emigrated from Spain to the Netherlands and South America following the expulsion in 1492. Some families with the surname ‘Salas’ remained in Spain despite the persecution.

== People ==
- Ada Salas (born 1965), Spanish poet and author
- Agustín Salas del Valle (born 1964), Mexican serial killer
- Ailín Salas (born 1993), Argentine actress
- Alfonso Rodríguez Salas (1939–1994), Spanish footballer
- Alvaro Salas (born 1953), Uruguayan percussionist
- Ángel Salas Larrazábal (1906–1994), Spanish fighter ace and military officer
- Angelica Salas, American immigration activist
- Benito Salas Vargas (1770–1816), military leader during Colombia's independence war
- Berta Vicente Salas (born 1994), Spanish photographer
- Carlos Salas (born 1955), Cuban volleyball player
- Carlos Salas Salas (first elected 1909), Chilean politician
- Claudia Hernández (tennis), full name Claudia Hernández Salas (born 1966), Mexican tennis player
- Dagoberto Campos Salas (born 1966), Costa Rican Catholic archbishop
- Damian Salas (born 1975), Argentine poker player
- Dani Salas (born 1988), Spanish footballer
- Daysi Salas (born 1961), Chilean sprinter
- Didac Salas (born 1993), Spanish pole vaulter
- Esther Salas (born 1968), American judge
- Ethan Salas (born 2006), American baseball player
- Federico Salas (1950–2021), Peruvian politician
- Fernando de Valdés y Salas (1483–1568), Spanish churchman and professor
- Fernando Salas (baseball) (born 1985), Mexican baseball player
- Franklin Salas (born 1981), Ecuadorian footballer
- Guillermo Salas (born 1974), Peruvian footballer
- Greg Salas (born 1988), American football player
- Henrique Salas Römer (born 1936), Venezuelan entrepreneur and politician
- Hilden Salas (born 1980), Peruvian footballer
- Ilse Salas (born 1981), Mexican actress
- Irma Salas Silva (1903–1987), Chilean educator
- José Mariano Salas (1797–1867), Mexican general and politician, interim president
- Joseph Salas (1903–1987), American boxer
- Juan Salas (born 1978), Dominican baseball player
- Justin Salas (born 1982), American mixed martial artist
- Lauro Salas (1928–1987), Mexican boxer
- Lizette Salas (born 1989), American golfer
- Marcelo Salas (born 1974), Chilean footballer
- Margarita Salas (1938–2019), Spanish scientist
- Marina Salas (born 1988), Spanish actress
- Marino Salas (born 1981), baseball player
- Mario Salas Saieg (born 1967), Chilean footballer
- Mark Salas (born 1961), American baseball player
- Mary Salas (born 1948), American politician
- Nancy Salas (1910–1990), Australian musicologist
- Olimpia Salas Martínez (born 1958), Mexican material scientist
- Óscar Salas (born 1993), Honduran footballer
- Óscar Salas Moya (1936–2017), Bolivian politician
- Patricia Salas O'Brien (born 1958), Peruvian sociologist and politician
- Paul Salas (born 1998), Filipino actor and model
- Pito Salas, Curaçaoan-American software developer
- Rafael M. Salas (1928–1987), first head of the United Nations Population Fund
- Renee Salas (started med school 2004), American physician and professor
- Rodolfo Salas (1928–2010), Peruvian basketball player
- Rudy Salas (born 1977), American politician
- Rudy Salas (musician), American musician, founding member of El Chicano
- Stephanie Salas (born 1970), Mexican singer and actress
- Stevie Salas (born 1964), Native American guitarist and author
- Tito Salas (1887–1974), Venezuelan painter
- Víctor Salas Escobar (1935–2021), Peruvian footballer
- Víctor Salas Baños (born 1980), Spanish footballer
- Vincent Salas (born 1989), Chilean footballer
- Walter Salas-Humara, American songwriter, founding member of The Silos
- Wilma Salas (born 1991), Cuban volleyball player

== Fictional characters ==
- Paquita Salas, on the Spanish comedy web television series Paquita Salas
- Yelina Salas, on the CBS television series CSI: Miami
- Will Salas, in the 2011 science fiction film In Time
- Roger Salas, in the American heist drama streaming television series Kaleidoscope

== See also ==
- Sala (disambiguation)
  - Sala (name)
- Salaš (disambiguation)
