= Salah (disambiguation) =

Salah is the Islamic prayer. Salah may also refer to:

- Salah (name), a Biblical and an Arabic given name and family name
  - Salah (biblical figure), an ancestor of the Israelites
  - Salah (dancer) (born 1979), a French hip-hop dancer
- Salah, Iran, a village
- Salah, today called Barıştepe, Midyat, a village in Turkey

== See also ==
- Saleh (name)
- Saladin (disambiguation)
- Salat (disambiguation)
- Selah (disambiguation)
- Sala (disambiguation)
- Salla (disambiguation)
- Sallah (disambiguation)
