= Salat (disambiguation) =

Salah, or salat, is the Islamic prayer.

Salat or salaat may also refer to: Solat

- Salat, Iran, a village
- Salat, Kulpahar, India, a village
- Salat (river), in France
- Salaat (caste), a Hindu caste in India
- Salaat (Muslim), Muslim converts from the Hindu Salaat caste
- Jana Salat (born 1979), a Canadian water polo player
- Salaat (film), 2010

== See also ==
- Salah (disambiguation)
- Salad
