= Salaš (disambiguation) =

Salaš or szállás is a type of farm in the Pannonian region (Hungary, Croatia, Czech Republic, Slovakia, Serbia).

Salaš may also refer to:

- Salaš (Zaječar), village in Serbia
- Salaš (Uherské Hradiště District), village and municipality in the Czech Republic
- Salaš Noćajski, village in Serbia
- Salaš Crnobarski, village in Serbia
