= Salla (disambiguation) =

Salla may refer to:

Places

- Salla, municipality in Lapland, Finland
- Salla, Styria, municipality in Voitsberg, Styria, Austria
- Salla, Estonia, village in Väike-Maarja Parish, Lääne-Viru County, Estonia
- Salla Qullu, mountain in Bolivia

People

- Salla Tykkä (born 1973), Finnish visual artist
- Aura Salla (born 1984), Finnish politician
- Sal·la, bishop of Urgell from 981 to 1010

Other

- Salla disease, genetic disorder
- La Salla, 1996 Canadian film

== See also ==
- Sala (disambiguation)
- Salah (disambiguation)
- Sallah (disambiguation)
