= Hajjah (disambiguation) =

Hajjah may refer to:

== Places ==
- Hajjah, a city in Yemen
- Hajjah Governorate in Yemen
- Hajjah, Palestine, a Palestinian village in the West Bank
- Hajjeh, Lebanon, a village in Lebanon
- Hajja, Morocco, a Moroccan settlement
- Hajja, Syria, a village in southern Syria's Golan Heights

== Cultural ==
- Hajjah, a term used for a female pilgrim who has performed the Islamic pilgrimage of the Hajj

== See also ==
- Hajji (disambiguation)
