= Janko Veselinović (writer) =

Serbian writer

Janko Veselinović Јанко Веселиновић
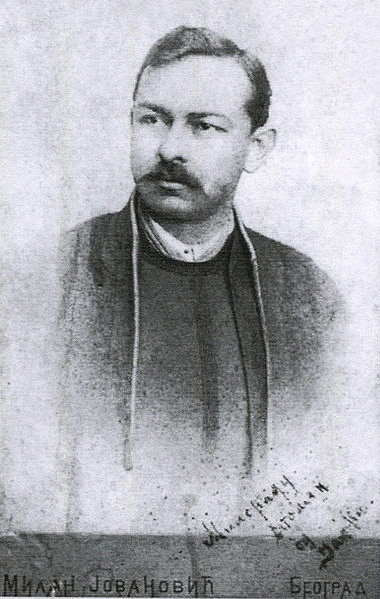
- Born: 13 May 1862; Salaš Crnobarski, Principality of Serbia
- Died: 26 June 1905 (aged 43); Glogovac, Bogatić, Kingdom of Serbia
- Occupations: Novelist, short story writer, dramatist
- Writing career
- Literary movement: Literary realism

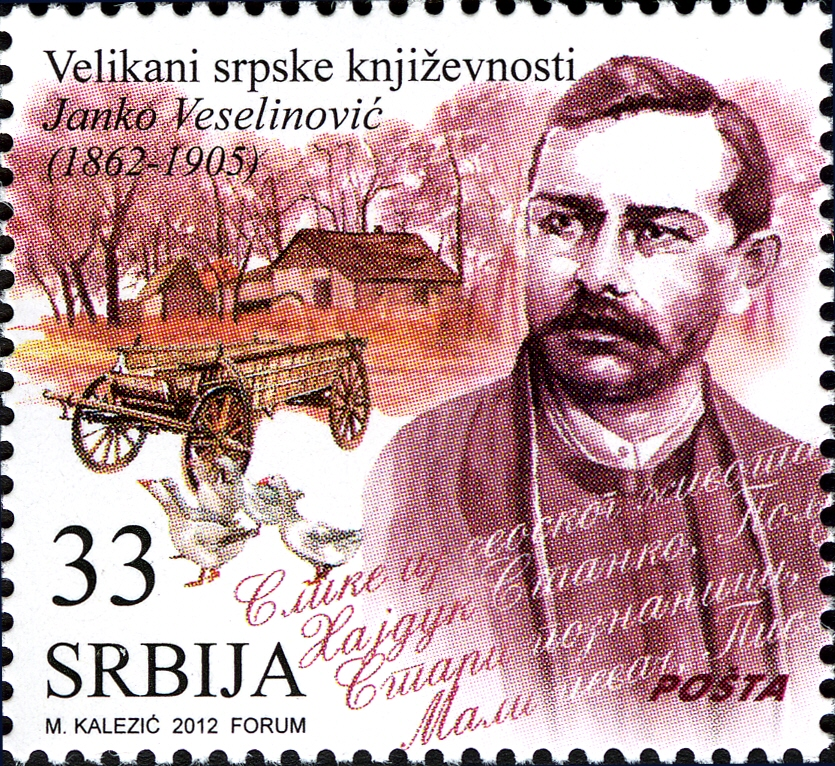
Janko Veselinović on a 2012 Serbian stamp

Janko Veselinović (Serbian Cyrillic: Јанко Веселиновић, pronounced [ˌjâːŋko ʋeseˈlǐːnoʋit͜ɕ]; 13 May 1862 – 26 June 1905) was a Serbian writer and novelist.

== Biography ==
Janko Veselinović was born in Salaš Crnobarski on 1 May 1862 to a Serbian Orthodox family. He completed elementary school in Šabac in 1878 and enrolled into teacher's college in Belgrade from which he dropped out. He worked as a teacher between 1880 and 1882 as well as between 1886 and 1889. From 1893 he worked as an assistant for the Srpske novine newspaper editor. As an enemy of the regime he lost his job in 1899–1900 and he was arrested on three separate occasions, in 1888, 1899 and 1903. He died on 19 June 1905.

== Works ==
- Pastoral: Stories from Rural Life (Сељанка: приповетке из сеоског живота), novel 1888
- Pictures of Rural Life (Слике из сеоског живота), story, 2 volumes, 1886–88
- Wild Flowers (Пољско цвеће), story, 1890–1891
- Paradise of the Soul (Рајске душе), story, 1893
- Stari poznavitsi (Стари познавици), story, 1891–96
- Hajduk Stanko (Хајдук Станко), novel, 1896
- Fighters (Борци), stories
- Letters from the Village (Писма са села), stories
- Complete works (Целокупна дела) 9 volumes
- The Flute Player, story
- Poteru, play (in collaboration with Čiča Ilija Stanojević), 1895
