= Bouregreg =

River in Morocco

Coordinates: 34.0319°N 6.83083°W

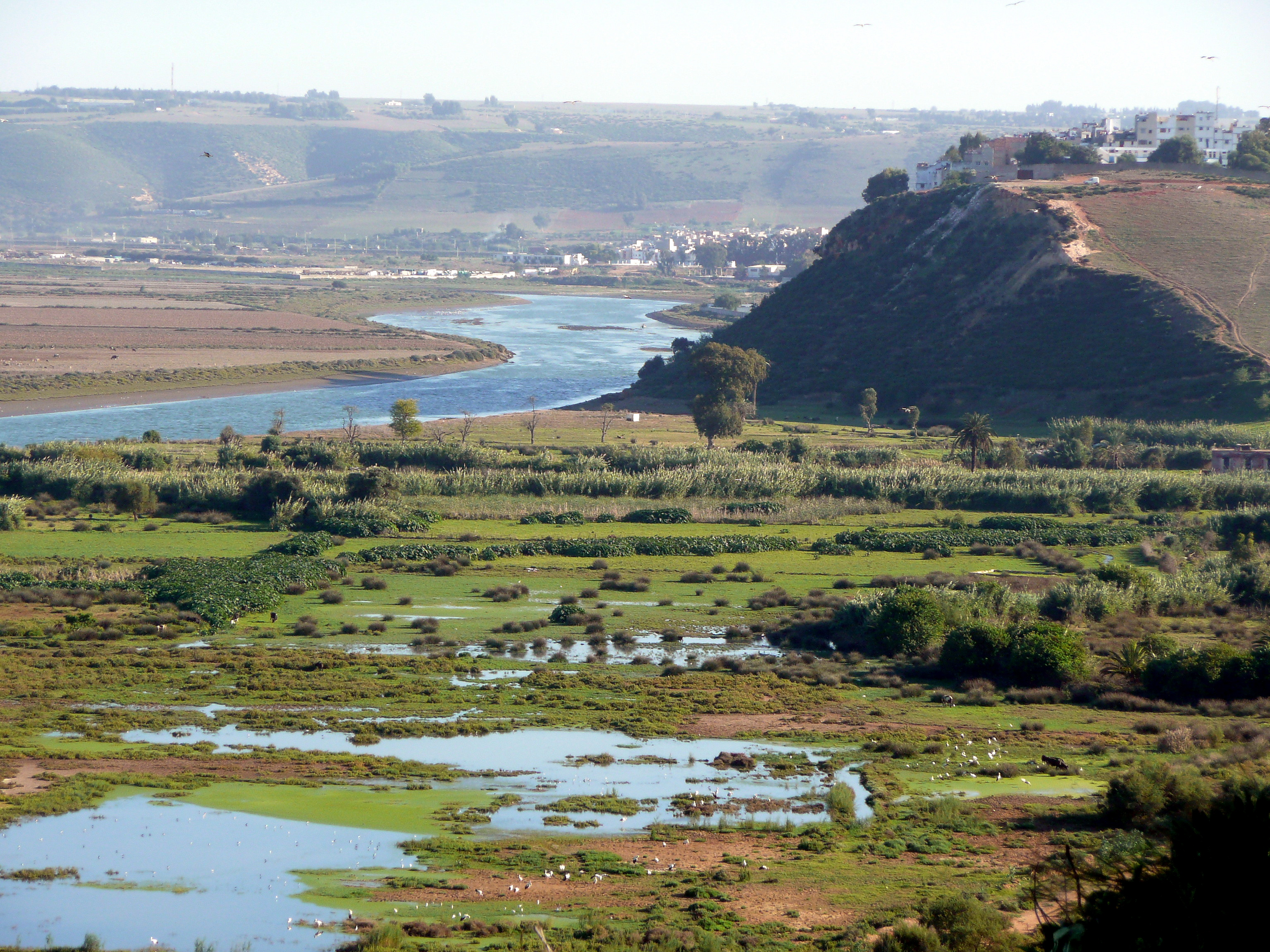
- Valley of the Bouregreg near Rabat, Morocco

Location
- Country: Morocco

Physical characteristics
- Mouth
  - location: Atlantic Ocean
- Length: 240 km (150 mi)

The Bouregreg (Arabic: أبو رقراق) is a river located in western Morocco which discharges into the Atlantic Ocean between the cities of Rabat and Salé. The estuary of this river is termed Wadi Sala.

The river is 240 kilometres long, with a tidal estuary of approximately 24 kilometres extending upriver. Its average discharge is 23 m^{3}/s and can reach 1500 m^{3}/s during periods of flooding. The river originates in the Middle Atlas mountains at an altitude of 1627 meters on the level of Jbel Mtourzgane (province of Khemisset) and of Grou (province of Khénifra) and descends to its mouth at the Atlantic Ocean, separating the cities of Rabat to the south and Salé to the north.

== Water quality ==
Water quality issues of the Bouregreg include tidal saltwater intrusion, excessive runoff of nitrates from agricultural land uses and mercury contamination thought to arise from use of certain pesticides within the drainage basin.

== History ==
The Phoenicians and the Carthaginians, who founded several colonies in Morocco, inhabited the banks of the Bouregreg approximately two kilometers from its mouth at the ancient site of Chellah. This archaeological site contains the ruins of a Roman town known as Sala Colonia and referred to as Sala by Ptolemy. Chellah was a significant ancient port city with remains including the Decumanus Maximus, or principal roadway, as well as those of a forum, a monumental fountain, a triumphal arch, and other Roman ruins.

== See also ==
- Hajja, Morocco
- Republic of Salé
