= Mirimli =

- Municipality
- Location within Azerbaijan
- Coordinates: 38°57′N 48°20′E
- Country: Azerbaijan
- Rayon: Yardymli

Population
  - Total: 1,200
- Time zone: UTC+4 (AZT)
  - Summer (DST): UTC+5 (AZT)

Mirimli is a village and municipality in Yardymli Rayon, Azerbaijan. It has a population of 1,200. The municipality consists of the villages of Mirimli and Şələ.
