= Saila =

Saila is a name. Variations include Säilä.

== List of people with the given name ==
- Saila Kinni (born 1987), Finnish orienteering competitor
- Saila Ithayaraj (born 1977), Sri Lankan women's rights activist
- Saila Laakkonen, Finnish actress
- Saila Saari (born 1989), Finnish ice hockey player
- Saila Quicklund (born 1961), Swedish politician

== List of people with the surname ==
- Pauta Saila (1916 or 1917–2009), Inuk artist
- Pekka Säilä (1941–2009), Finnish tennis player
- Pitaloosie Saila (1942–2021), Inuk artist

== See also ==
- Sala (disambiguation)
