= Sallah (disambiguation) =

Sallah is a fictional character in Indiana Jones films. Sallah may also refer to:

== People ==
- Halifa Sallah (born 1953), Gambian politician
- Michael D. Sallah, American investigative reporter
- Nansok Sallah (1966?-2012), Nigerian journalist
- Ousman Sallah (born 1968), Gambian athlete
- Tijan Sallah (born 1958), Gambian poet
- Cheick Sallah Cissé (born 1993), Ivorian taekwondo athlete
- Mohammed Sallah (born 2006), Gambian footballer

== Other uses ==
- Sallah Shabati, film
- Suleh, Zanjan, village in Iran also known as Sallāh

== See also ==
- Sala (disambiguation)
- Salah (disambiguation)
- Salla (disambiguation)
