= Kak (commune) =

Kak កក់
- Commune
- Location within Cambodia
- Country: Cambodia
- Province: Ratanakiri
- District: Bar Kaev

Population (1998)
  - Total: 1,729
- Time zone: UTC+7 (ICT)
- Geocode: 160301

Kak (Khmer: កក់, pronounced [kɑk]) is a commune (khum) in Bar Kaev District in northeast Cambodia. It contains six villages and has a population of 1,729. In the 2007 commune council elections, all five of its seats were awarded to members of the Cambodian People's Party. Land alienation has been a major problem in Kak; the indigenous community now owns very little agricultural land. (See Ratanakiri Province for background information on land alienation.)

== Villages ==
Village	Population (1998)	Sex ratio (male/female) (1998)	Number of households (1998)
Reung Touch	145	1.07	28
Sala (also Srala)	245	1.15	37
Ka Chak	347	0.92	51
Kak	303	0.87	52
Yeun	466	1.02	74
Chrung	223	0.87	36
