= Sala (surname) =

Family name

Origin
- Region of origin: Italy

Sala is a surname with several origins. First, in Italian, Catalan, Portuguese, Spanish, Occitan, and Romanian, a topographic or occupational name meaning someone living in or employed at a hall or manor. Notable people with the surname include:

== Arts and entertainment ==
=== Musicians ===
- Alessandro Sala (composer) (1816–1890), Italian composer, organist, and pianist
- Flavio Sala (born 1983), Italian Classical guitar player
- Ingrid Sala Santamaria (born 1940), Filipina pianist
- Nicola Sala (1713–1801), Italian composer
- Oskar Sala (1910–2002), German composer
- Pep Sala (born 1960), Catalan musician, songwriter and record producer

=== Other arts ===
- Anri Sala (born 1974), Albanian artist
- Emilio Sala (painter) (1850–1910), Spanish painter
- Emilio Sala (sculptor) (1864–1920), Italian sculptor
- Emilio Grau Sala (1911–1975), Catalan painter
- Giuseppe Sala (music publisher) (c.1643—1727), music publisher
- Richard Sala (1954–2020), American cartoonist, illustrator and comic book creator

== Athletes ==
- Albert Sala (born 1981), Spanish field hockey player
- Andrea Sala (footballer) (born 1993), Italian footballer
- Carlos Sala (born 1960), retired Spanish hurdler
- Claudio Sala (born 1947), former Italian association football player and current commentator
- Costantino Sala (1913–?), Italian professional football player
- Darío Sala (born 1974), Argentine football goalkeeper
- Emiliano Sala (1990–2019), Argentine football forward
- Giovanni Sala (born 1963), Italian enduro rider and a six-time World Enduro Champion
- Guido Sala (1928–1987), Italian Grand Prix motorcycle road racer and world champion kart racer
- Jacopo Sala (born 1991), Italian footballer
- Lee Sala (born 1926–2012), American contender for the middleweight boxing crown in the 1940s and 1950s
- Luigi Sala (born 1974), Italian football defender
- Luis Pérez-Sala (born 1959), Catalan-Spanish racing driver
- Manuel Sala (born 1982), Angolan football player
- Marco Sala (footballer, born 1886) (1886–1969), Italian professional footballer, who played as a defender
- Marco Sala (footballer, born 1999), Italian football defender
- Patrizio Sala (born 1955), Italian former footballer
- Ramón Sala (born 1971), Spanish field hockey defender
- Valentino Sala (1908–?), Italian football player and coach

== Politics ==
- Giuseppe Sala (born 1958), Italian politician
- Michel Sala (born 1954) is an Algerian-born French trade unionist and politician
- Milagro Sala (born 1964), leader of the Tupac Amaru neighborhood association, Argentina
- Ricardo Sala Gaitán (fl. 1992–1996), Colombian industrial engineer and politician

== Others ==
- Enric Sala Rosés (1934-2025) Spanish writer and economist
- Roberto Sala (born 1974) Costarican-born American computer scientist in AI
- Mario Sala (born 1972) Catalan medical doctor
- Alessandra Sala, Italian computer scientist
- André Ricard Sala (born 1929), Catalan industrial designer
- Enric Sala (born 1968), marine ecologist and an Explorer-in-Residence at National Geographic
- Galdino della Sala (1096–1176), tenth century Christian saint from Milan, Italy
- George Augustus Sala (1828–1895), British journalist
- Giuseppe Antonio Sala (1762–1839), Italian cardinal
- Jean Sala Breitenstein (1900–1986), United States federal judge
- Louis Sala-Molins (born 1935), essayist and political philosophy professor at Paris-I and Toulouse-II universities
- Luc Sala (born 1949), Dutch entrepreneur and writer
- Oscar Sala (1922–2010), Italian-Brazilian nuclear physicist
- Xavier Sala-i-Martin (born 1963), Spanish academic economist

== See also ==
- Sala (given name)
