= Salla Qullu =

Mountain in Bolivia

- Location within Bolivia

Highest point
- Elevation: 4,990 m (16,370 ft)
- Coordinates: 18°29′01″S 68°59′59″W

Geography
- Location: Bolivia, Oruro Department
- Parent range: Andes, Cordillera Occidental

Salla Qullu (Aymara salla steep ridge or boulders, qullu mountain, Hispanicized spelling Salla Kkollu, Salla Khollu) is a 4,990-metre-high (16,371 ft) mountain in the Cordillera Occidental in the Andes of Bolivia. It is situated in the Oruro Department, Sajama Province, Turco Municipality, Chachacomani Canton, south-east of the mountain Capurata and the Acotango volcano and south of the Bolivian Route 4 that leads to Tambo Quemado on the border with Chile.

== See also ==
- Kuntur Ikiña
- Umurata
- Wallatiri
- Sajama National Park
- Wila Qullu
- List of mountains in the Andes
