= Berta Vicente Salas =

Spanish photographer (born 1994)

Berta Vicente Salas is a Spanish photographer. She was born in Barcelona, Spain, on 22 March 1994.

== Work ==
By 2013, at the age of 19, she was the finalist in the Sony World Photography Awards for her photograph Ariadna in Urquinaona from her series Urquinaona. It was shot in an abandoned building in Spain, which she described:

'This is a building that was going to be demolished to have a hotel built. Luckily, I found it before the demolition, and its caretaker allowed me to explore the amazing place. It was probably some of the most magical places I’ve ever been. It's located in the Barcelona city center, and is now a hotel.'

Vicente Salas began a project in Australia along with the photographer Ibai Acevedo named Antipodes. She started to study visual research in the Open University of Catalonia .

In 2016 her series of work about the women penitentiary was released. Vicente Salas traveled to Mexico to teach photography in the prison of Ciudad Juárez as a social program and began her series Centro Penitenciario de Menores, Ciudad De Juárez México.

In an interview for IT Fashion online magazine, Vicente Salas explained the process of her work:

I have the feeling of always being rehearsing. I practice and then I start creating. I want to experiment and then be sure of what I am doing. What I do, I do it guiding myself through my interests of the moment, and I am drawn to people. I love them. They are fascinating. I love how you can create a time of making a picture and understand what the person you are photographing is giving to you.’

== Awards ==
2014: FLICKR 20 under 20: Selected photographer 2014: Project GrisArt Scholarship

2013: Fototalentos Banco Santander Foundation: First prize 2013: Sony World Photography Awards: First position for portrait category.

2012: Sony World Photography Awards: Finalist in the category of portraits for the convocation of YOUTH.

2011: Emergent Festival of Lleida: selected artist.

== Exhibitions ==
2015: TEDxyouth BCN: Sala Ciutat, Barcelona City Hall

2014: FLICKR 20 under 20 en Milk Studios, New York

2014: PALMAPHOTO 2014 Xavier Fiol Gallery, Palma de Mallorca, España

2014: REVELA-T festival in Can Manyer Library, Vilassar de Dalt-Barcelona

2014: Barcelona Negra, Valid Foto Gallery, Barcelona

2014: O.F.N.I in Valid Foto Gallery, Barcelona

2013: Sony World Photography Awards 2013, Somerset House (Arts and Cultural Centre) London 2013: Colecciona el mundo in Valid Foto Gallery, Barcelona

2013: Realidad y emoción in Valid Foto Gallery, Barcelona

2012: Sony World Photography Awards 2012, Somerset House (Arts and Cultural Centre) London 2012: Emergent Lleida 2011, Valid Foto Gallery, Barcelona
