= Sala Parish =

Sala parish (Latvian: Salas pagasts) can refer to:

- Sala Parish, Mārupe Municipality;
- Sala Parish, Jēkabpils Municipality.
