= Sala, Cambodia =

Sala
- Village
- Interactive map of Sala
- Coordinates: 10°54′N 104°47′E
- Country: Cambodia
- Province: Ratanakiri
- District: Bar Kaev
- Commune: Kak

Population (1998)
  - Total: 245
- Time zone: UTC+7 (ICT)

Sala (also transliterated Srala) is a village in Kak Commune in northeast Cambodia. As of 1998, it had a population of 245 in 37 households and a sex ratio of 1.15 men to 1 woman. Its chief was Sev Yun as of 2006. Village chiefs are selected by consensus by elders and other villagers in a discussion that can take two to three days. Some leaders are selected based on visions in dreams. After a chief is appointed, a ceremony is held so that the new chief can gain recognition and trust from the villagers.
