= Hajja, Morocco =

Settlement in western coastal Morocco

Coordinates: 34°02′N 6°50′W

Hajja is a settlement located in the western coastal region of Morocco, near Rabat. The earliest recorded history of the general vicinity is associated with the now-ruined medieval archeological site Chellah, situated along the estuarine portion of the Oued Bou Regreg. Chellah was originally settled by the Phoenicians, and later became a Roman settlement, before it was abandoned in Late Antiquity.

== See also ==
- Chellah
