= Şələ =

Coordinates: 38°58′49″N 48°19′32″E

Şələ is a village in the municipality of Mirimli in the Yardymli Rayon of Azerbaijan.
