= Suteh, Kurdistan =

Suteh سوته
- Village
- Location within Iran
- Coordinates: 35°57′10″N 46°19′30″E
- Country: Iran
- Province: Kurdistan
- County: Saqqez
- Bakhsh: Sarshiv
- Rural District: Chehel Cheshmeh-ye Gharbi

Population (2006)
  - Total: 122
- Time zone: UTC+3:30 (IRST)
  - Summer (DST): UTC+4:30 (IRDT)

Suteh (Persian: سوته, also Romanized as Sūteh; also known as Sāla, Sāleh, and Seyf Ţāleh) is a village in Chehel Cheshmeh-ye Gharbi Rural District, Sarshiv District, Saqqez County, Kurdistan Province, Iran. At the 2006 census, its population was 122, in 19 families. The village is populated by Kurds.
