= Dani Salas =

Spanish footballer

Personal information
- Full name: Daniel Salas Del Sar
- Date of birth: 23 February 1988 (age 38)
- Place of birth: Seville, Spain
- Height: 1.74 m (5 ft 9 in)
- Position: Right back

Youth career
- Sevilla

Senior career*
Years	Team	Apps	(Gls)
2007–2008	Sevilla C	19	(0)
2008–2009	Sevilla B	15	(0)
2009–2011	Eibar	8	(0)
2009	→ Alcalá (loan)	5	(0)
2011	San Roque	9	(0)
2011–2012	Poli Ejido	6	(0)
2012–2016	Mairena		
- * Club domestic league appearances and goals

Daniel "Dani" Salas Del Sar (born 23 February 1988) is a Spanish former professional footballer who played as a right back, and a scout at English club Leeds United.

== Playing career ==
Born in Seville, Salas spent the vast majority of his senior career in his native Andalusia. He appeared in two Segunda División seasons with Sevilla FC's reserves, his first league match occurring on 6 January 2008 in a 2–1 away win against Hércules CF where he started.

On the last day of 2008–09, Salas was sent off late into a 3–3 away draw to Alicante CF. Both teams were relegated at the end of the campaign.

Subsequently, Salas represented in quick succession CD Alcalá, SD Eibar, CD San Roque de Lepe, Polideportivo Ejido and CD Mairena.

== Scouting career ==
Salas joined English Championship club Leeds United in 2017, as part of compatriot Víctor Orta's scouting network.
