= Salaš (Uherské Hradiště District) =

- Municipality
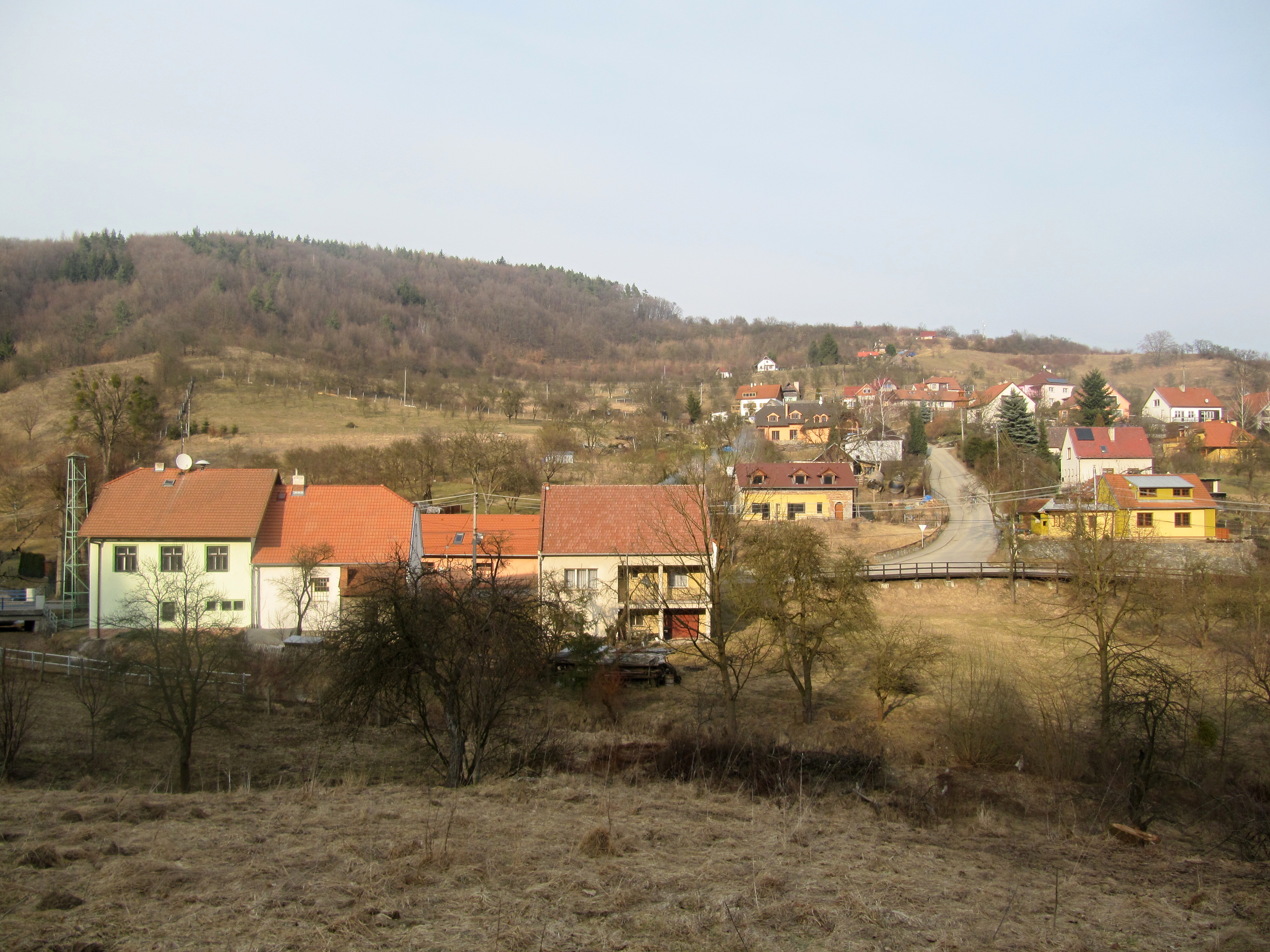
- General view

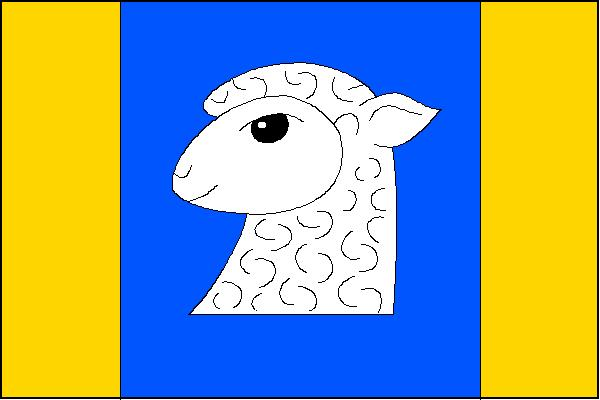
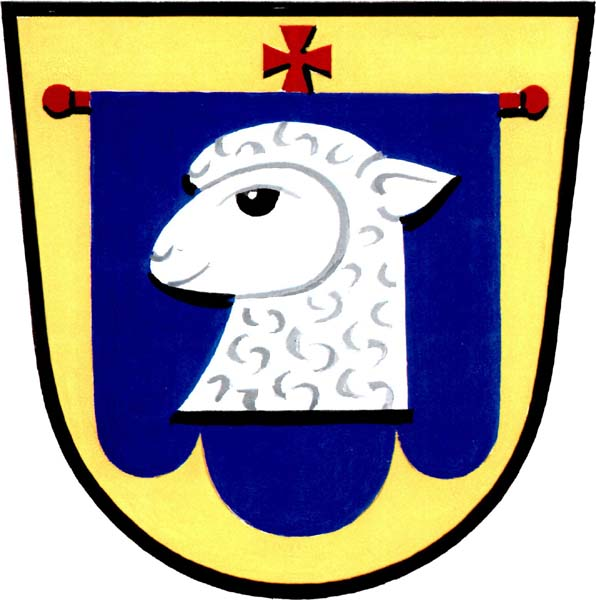
- Flag Coat of arms

- Location in the Czech Republic
- Coordinates: 49°8′26″N 17°20′34″E
- Country: Czech Republic
- Region: Zlín
- District: Uherské Hradiště
- First mentioned: 1652

Area
  - Total: 17.87 km^{2} (6.90 sq mi)
- Elevation: 270 m (890 ft)

Population (2026-01-01)
  - Total: 409
  - Density: 22.9/km^{2} (59.3/sq mi)
- Time zone: UTC+1 (CET)
  - Summer (DST): UTC+2 (CEST)
- Postal code: 687 06
- Website: salasuh.cz

Salaš is a municipality and village in Uherské Hradiště District in the Zlín Region of the Czech Republic. It has about 400 inhabitants.

Salaš lies approximately 13 kilometres (8 mi) north-west of Uherské Hradiště, 26 km (16 mi) west of Zlín, and 236 km (147 mi) south-east of Prague.

== Demographics ==
Historical population
Year	Pop.	±%
1869	323	—
1880	357	+10.5%
1890	363	+1.7%
1900	392	+8.0%
1910	373	−4.8%
1921	402	+7.8%
1930	401	−0.2%
1950	327	−18.5%
1961	408	+24.8%
1970	428	+4.9%
1980	365	−14.7%
1991	359	−1.6%
2001	366	+1.9%
2011	380	+3.8%
2021	394	+3.7%
Source: Censuses
