= Salaš (Zaječar) =

- Village
- Location in Serbia
- Coordinates: 44°06′46″N 22°19′05″E
- Country: Serbia
- District: Zaječar District
- Municipality: Zaječar

Population (2002)
  - Total: 962
- Time zone: UTC+1 (CET)
  - Summer (DST): UTC+2 (CEST)

Salaš is a village in the municipality of Zaječar, Serbia. According to the 2002 census, the village has a population of 962 people.

== History ==
From 1929 to 1941, Salaš was part of the Morava Banovina of the Kingdom of Yugoslavia.
