= Sala (given name) =

Sala is a given name with several origins. In Hungarian, a short for the Biblical name Solomon and also a variant of the name Salah. Notable people named Sala include:

- Sala Baker (born 1976), New Zealand actor and stuntman
- Sala Burton (1925–1987), United States Representative from California
- Sala Fa'alogo (born 1977), New Zealand rugby league player
- Sala, folk hero who killed a tiger; see Hoysala Empire#History

== See also ==
- Sala (surname)
