= Chellah =

Archaeological site in Rabat, Morocco

Chellah / Shalla
- Sla / Calla (Shalla)
- Sala Colonia (name of Roman colony)
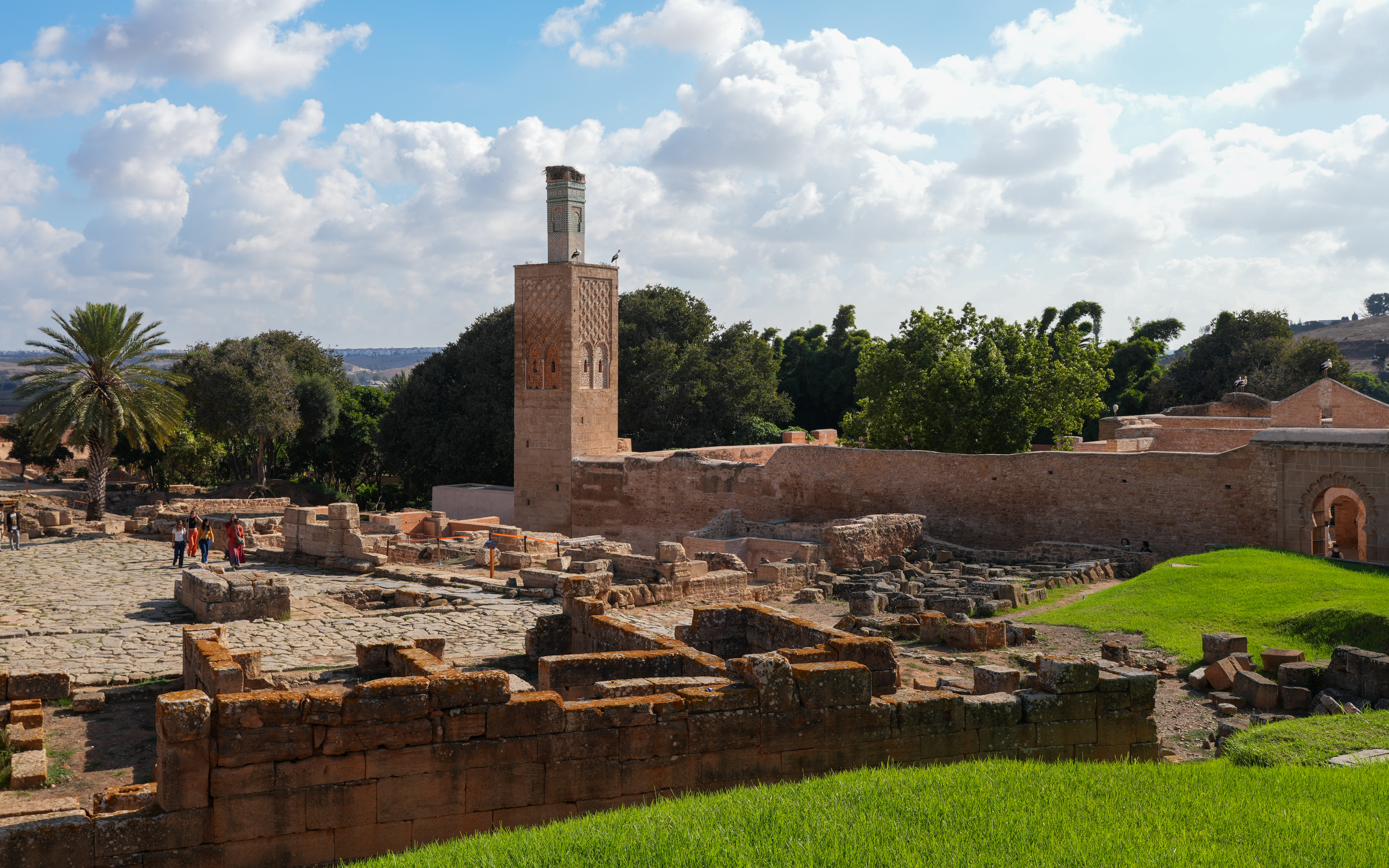
- Roman and Marinid remains inside the Chellah complex
- Interactive map of Chellah / Shalla
- 34°00′24″N 06°49′13″W
- Type: Necropolis
- Location: Rabat, Rabat-Salé-Kénitra, Morocco

History
- Abandoned: early 15th century

The Chellah or Shalla (Berber languages: Sla or Calla; Arabic: شالة) is a medieval fortified necropolis and ancient archeological site in Rabat, Morocco, located on the south (left) side of the Bou Regreg estuary.

The earliest evidence of the site's occupation suggests that the Phoenicians established a trading emporium here in the first millennium BC. The earliest building activities in Sala’s civic district date back to the Kingdom of Mauretania, This was later the site of Sala Colonia, an ancient Roman colony in the province of Mauretania Tingitana, before it was abandoned in Late Antiquity. In the late 13th century the site began to be used as a dynastic necropolis for the Marinid dynasty. By the mid-14th century Marinid sultans had enclosed a part of the site with a new set of walls and built a religious complex inside it to accompany their mausoleums.

In the 15th century the necropolis began to decline and it suffered damage over the centuries due to earthquakes and looting. Archeological excavations in the 20th century unearthed the remains of the ancient Roman town.

Today the site is a tourist attraction and since 2012 it forms part of a UNESCO World Heritage Site.

== History ==
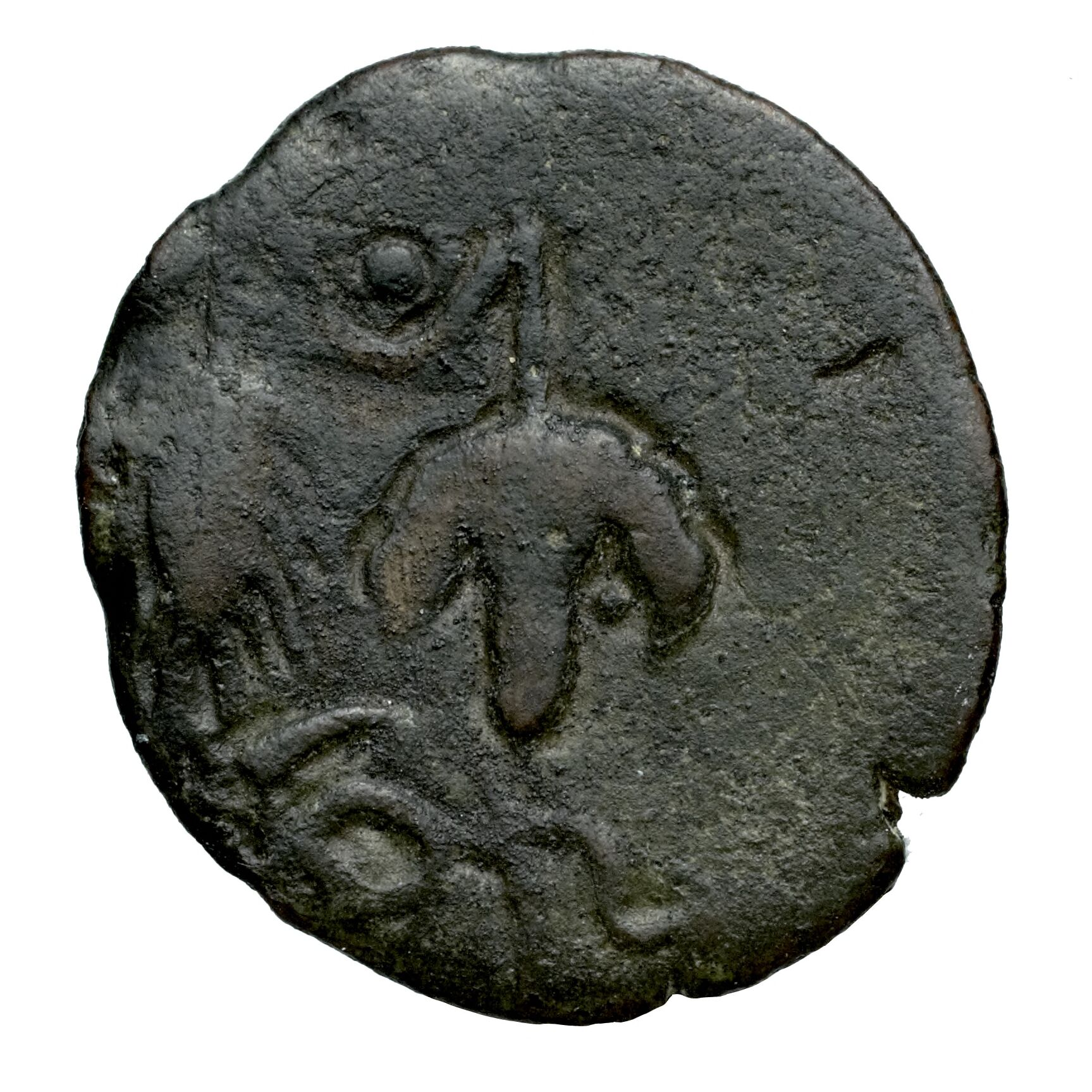
A coin from Sala with the name of the town in Punic

=== Phoenician Sala ===
The Phoenicians founded several trading colonies along the Atlantic coast of what is now Morocco, but the existence of a Phoenician settlement on the site of Chellah has been debated by archeologists. Jean Boube, who led some of the modern excavations at the site, discovered neo-Punic artifacts dating as far back as the 3rd century BC, which suggests there must have been a small trading post here around that time. Later excavations by Boube also found fragments of Phoenician or Punic bowls dating to the 7th and early 6th centuries BC, but it is possible that such early items were imported by trade rather than being evidence of occupation. The settlement along the banks of the Bou Regreg was known as Shalat (Punic: 𐤔𐤏𐤋𐤕, šʿlt; compare Hebrew סלע, rock), which appears to derive from the Punic word for "rock".

=== Mauretanian Sala ===
During the Mauretanian period (1st century BC), the urban center of Sala developed on hill terraces overlooking the Bou Regreg valley. The earliest documented building activity includes a multi-Cella temple (Temple A) featuring architectural elements such as Ionic half-columns and Egyptian-gorge cornices, reminiscent of Hellenistic and Numidian royal architectural styles. Under the client kings Juba II and his son Ptolemy, the site may have functioned as a dynastic or political sanctuary, a role suggested by the discovery of royal portrait statues on site. Additional pre-Roman structures included residential or administrative buildings made of stone socles with raw brick elevations, as well as a stone water-storage facility underneath later Roman structures.

By the first century BC the local inhabitants were still writing in the neo-Punic language but the region came under the influence of Rome. Under the last two rulers, Juba II and Ptolemy, the Mauretanian kingdom had already become a client state of Rome. Some relics from the time of these two kings have been discovered at Chellah. After the death of Ptolemy in 40 AD the region was fully annexed by Rome and became the province of Mauretania Tingitana.

=== Roman Sala Colonia ===
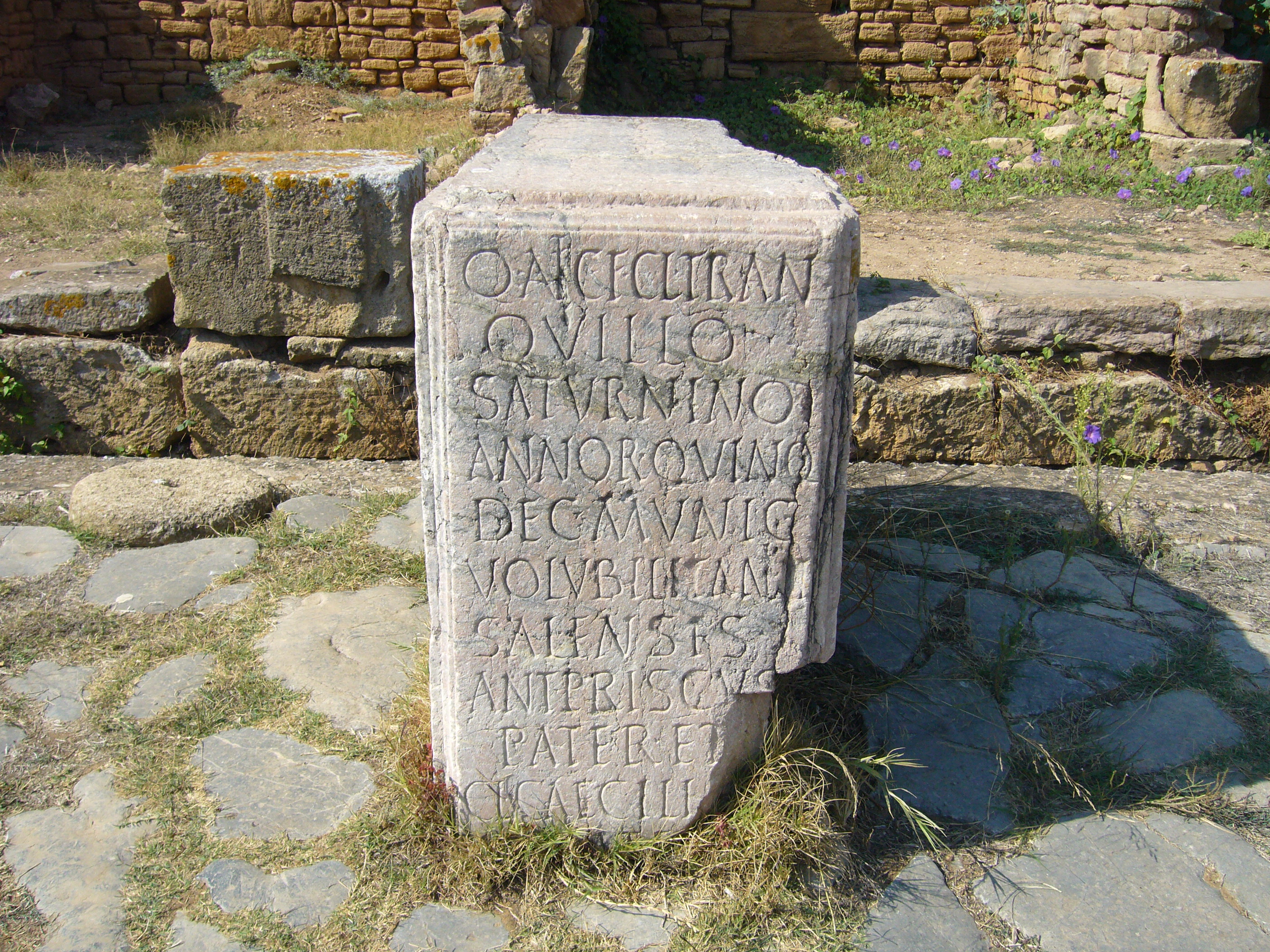
Roman funerary stele inscribed in Latin, Sala Colonia

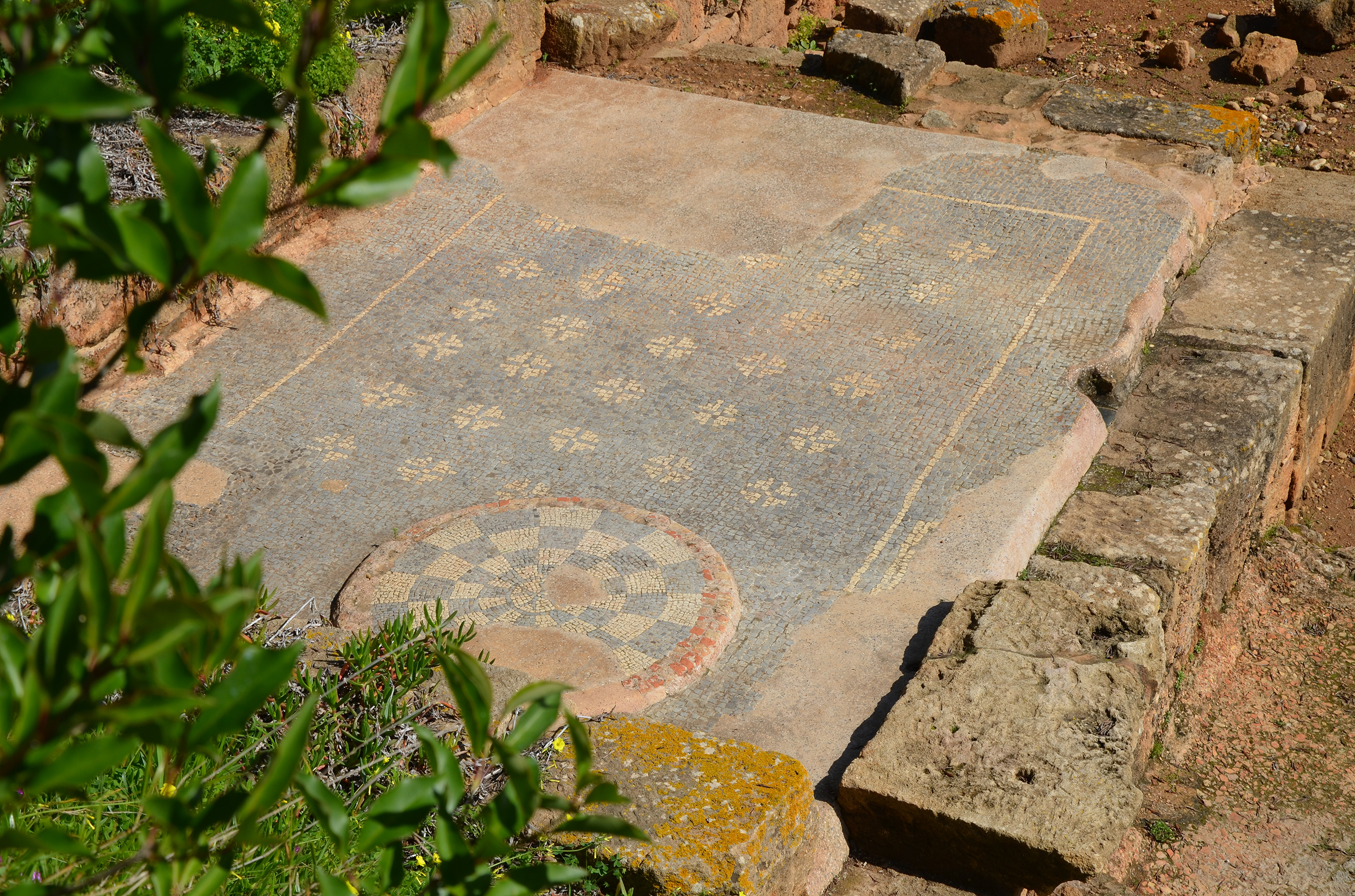
Roman mosaic in Sala Colonia

On this site the Romans built their own city, Sala Colonia. The Roman town was referred to as "Sala" by Ptolemy, a 2nd-century writer. Excavations have revealed that older Mauretanian structures existed on the site before Roman structures were built over them. For the Roman period, they show a substantial port city with ruined Roman architectural elements including a decumanus maximus or principal roadway, a forum and a triumphal arch. The area around the forum, excavated and visible today, was subjected to many transformations over time and the exact chronology of these is still debated. Inscriptions found on site show that the city had the status of a municipium around the mid-2nd century AD.

One of the two main Roman roads in Mauretania Tingitana reached the Atlantic through Iulia Constantia Zilil (Asilah), Lixus (Larache) and Sala Colonia. Another may have been built towards the south, from Sala to modern Casablanca, then called Anfa. The Romans had two main naval outposts on the Atlantic coast of the province: Sala Colonia, and Lixus. The port of Sala (now disappeared) was used by commercial Roman ships as a way station on their southwestward passages to Anfa and the Insula Purpuraria (Mogador island).

Sala remained linked to the Roman Empire even after the withdrawal in the 4th century of the occupying Roman legions to Tingis (Tangier) and Septem (Ceuta) in northern Mauretania Tingitana. A Roman military unit remained there until the end of the 5th century. Some of the major monuments of the town were abandoned around this time. The site of the large capitolium temple, for example, was turned into a cemetery and a dumping ground during the 4th century. Archaeological objects of Visigothic and Byzantine origin found in the area attest to the persistence of commercial or political contacts between Sala and Roman Europe, up to the establishment of a Byzantine presence in North Africa during the 7th century. Fragments of pottery with Christian motifs and graffiti have also been found among objects dating from the 4th to 6th centuries.

=== Early Muslim period ===
Sala began to be abandoned in the 5th century and was mostly in ruins when the Muslim Arabs arrived in the 7th century. The Byzantine governor of the area, Count Julian of Ceuta, surrendered to Uqba ibn Nafi in 683.

The area was only occupied again in the 10th century, when historical sources mention the existence of a ribat in the area. Around 1030, a new town called Salā (present-day Salé) was founded on the opposite side of the river (the north side) by the Banu 'Ashara family. After the end of the Umayyad Caliphate in Al-Andalus in the early 11th century, the Almoravids assumed control of the region and built a new ribat at the mouth of the river. This ribat was in turn destroyed and then rebuilt by their successors, the Almohads, in the mid-12th century, becoming what is now known as the Kasbah of the Udayas. The Almohad caliph Abu Yusuf Ya'qub al-Mansur (r. 1184–1199) also began construction of a vast new royal city with new walls on the site next to ancient Sala, corresponding to what is now the historic center of Rabat, but it was never finished. The town of Salā on the right bank (northern side) of the river continued to develop and during the following Marinid dynasty period (13th to 15th centuries) it grew more important than the settlements of the left bank.

=== Marinid period ===
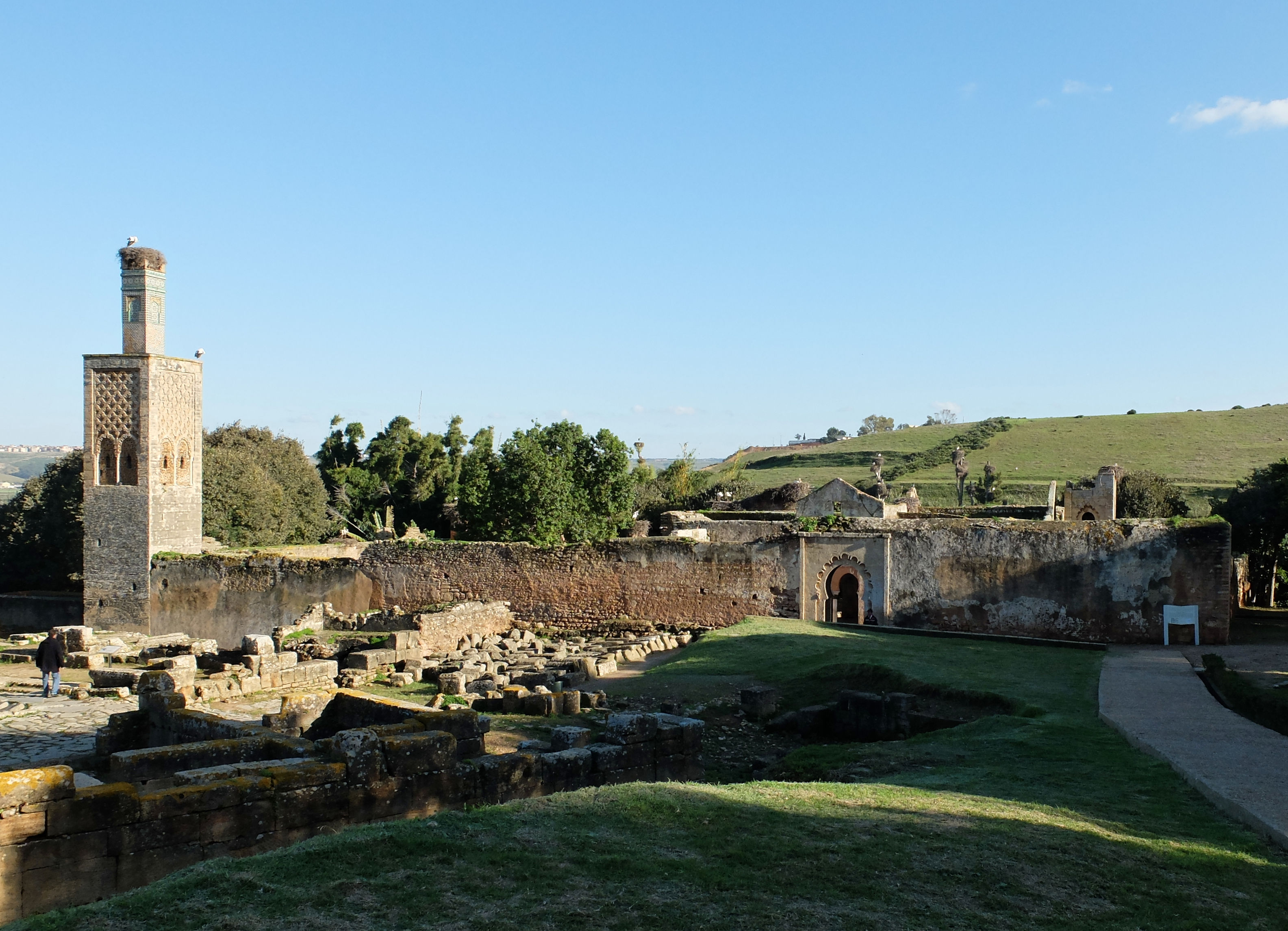
The Marinid religious complex of Chellah (13th–14th centuries)

During the Marinid period the site of ancient Sala was re-appropriated and turned into a royal necropolis for the ruling dynasty, now known as Chellah (Arabic: شالة, romanized: Shāllah). Because of its ruined condition today, the exact chronology of its development is not well known. The first Marinid constructions and the first royal burial were in 1284–85, when sultan Abu Yusuf Ya'qub chose the site to bury his wife, Umm al-'Izz. He built a small mosque (still extant) next to her tomb. The tomb itself was a qubba, a small mausoleum chamber covered by a dome or pyramidal roof. The sultan himself was buried next to her after his death in Algeciras in 1286. His son and successor, Abu Ya'qub Yusuf, was buried at the site after his death in 1307, and his successor, Abu Thabit 'Amir, was buried near Abu Ya'qub Yusuf in 1308.

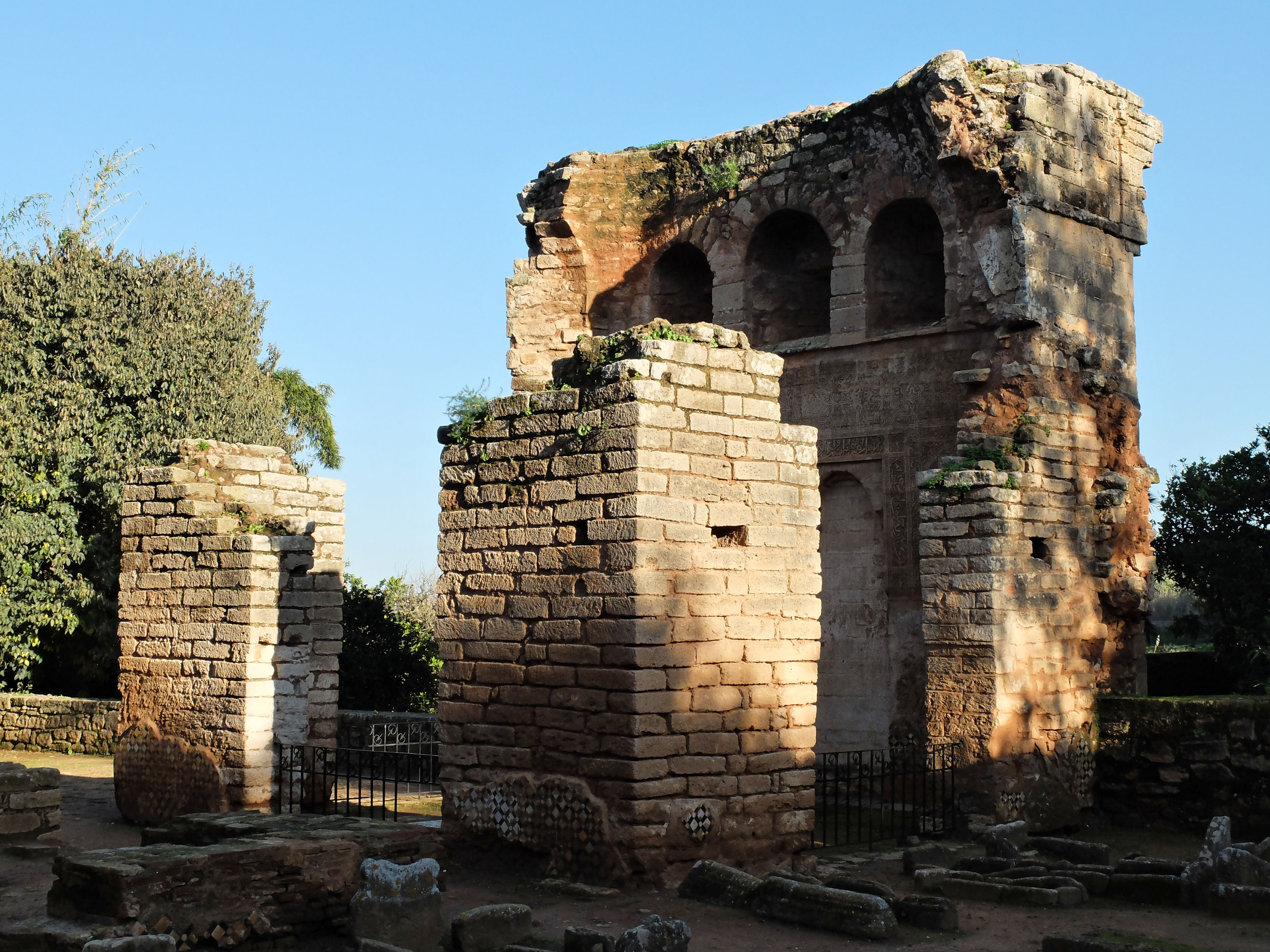
Remains of the Mausoleum of Abu al-Hasan (circa 1351)

The most important Marinid constructions appear to have occurred during the reigns of Abu Sa'id Uthman II (r. 1310–1331) and his son, Abu al-Hasan (r. 1331–1348; also known as the Black Sultan). Abu Sa'id enclosed the area with a set of walls and began construction of the main gate. According to some sources he was buried in this necropolis too after his death in 1331, though Ibn Khaldun wrote that he was buried in Fez. Construction of the main gate was finished by Abu al-Hasan, as evidenced by an inscription on it which dates its completion to July 1339 (Dhu al-Qadah 739 AH) and refers to the complex as a "ribat". During Abu al-Hasan's lifetime one of his wives, Shams al-Ḍuḥa (the mother of Abu Inan), was buried here in 1349. One of his sons, Abu Malik, may have also been buried in the necropolis in 1339. After his death in exile in 1351, Abu al-Hasan's body was buried in a mausoleum here as well, near his wife. (Note: He was initially buried in what is now the Saadian Tombs in Marrakesh, before his body was moved to Chellah.) This mausoleum may have been finished by his son and successor, Abu Inan (r. 1348–1358). Abu Inan may have also been responsible for building or completing the madrasa (Islamic college) and the prominent minaret that adjoin the mosque and mausoleums. He set up a charitable endowment (waqf) to fund the operations of the religious complex. Remains at the site today also show that the necropolis was accompanied by a residential quarter to the north, complete with a water supply system. A preserved hammam (bathhouse) from this period also stands near the far eastern corner of the walled enclosure.

Abu al-Hasan was the last sultan to be buried here. Abu Inan is believed to have been buried at the Great Mosque of Fes el-Jdid and other Marinid sultans after him were mostly buried at the Marinid Tombs in Fez or other sites. Other Marinid family members, such as Abu Inan's sister and other princes, were still occasionally buried at Chellah. Between 1360 and 1363 Ibn al-Khatib, the vizier of the Nasrid sultan Muhammad V, visited the site during his master's exile from Granada and mentioned it in his writings. He described the luxurious decoration of the tombs and noted that a large fragment of a kiswah (the cloth that covers the Ka'ba in Mecca) was draped over the tomb of Abu al-Hasan.

=== Post-Marinid period and modern era ===
After the Marinid period the necropolis declined. It was pillaged for the first time by Ahmad al-Liḥyani, a pretender to the Marinid throne based in Meknes between 1417 and 1437. Although he and other pretenders were eventually suppressed by Abu Zakariya Yahya, the regent and de facto Wattasid ruler between 1420 and 1448, the Wattasids chose not to try and restore the necropolis. Many of the remaining structures in Chellah were damaged by the 1755 Lisbon earthquake and fell into ruins. The 'Alawi sultans stationed soldiers here afterwards to prevent further looting, but in the late 18th century an Arab tribe, the Ṣabbaḥ, took possession of the enclosure until in 1790 sultan Moulay Yazid charged the governor of Salé, Abu Ya'za al-Qasṭali, with removing them. During this episode the necropolis was again looted.

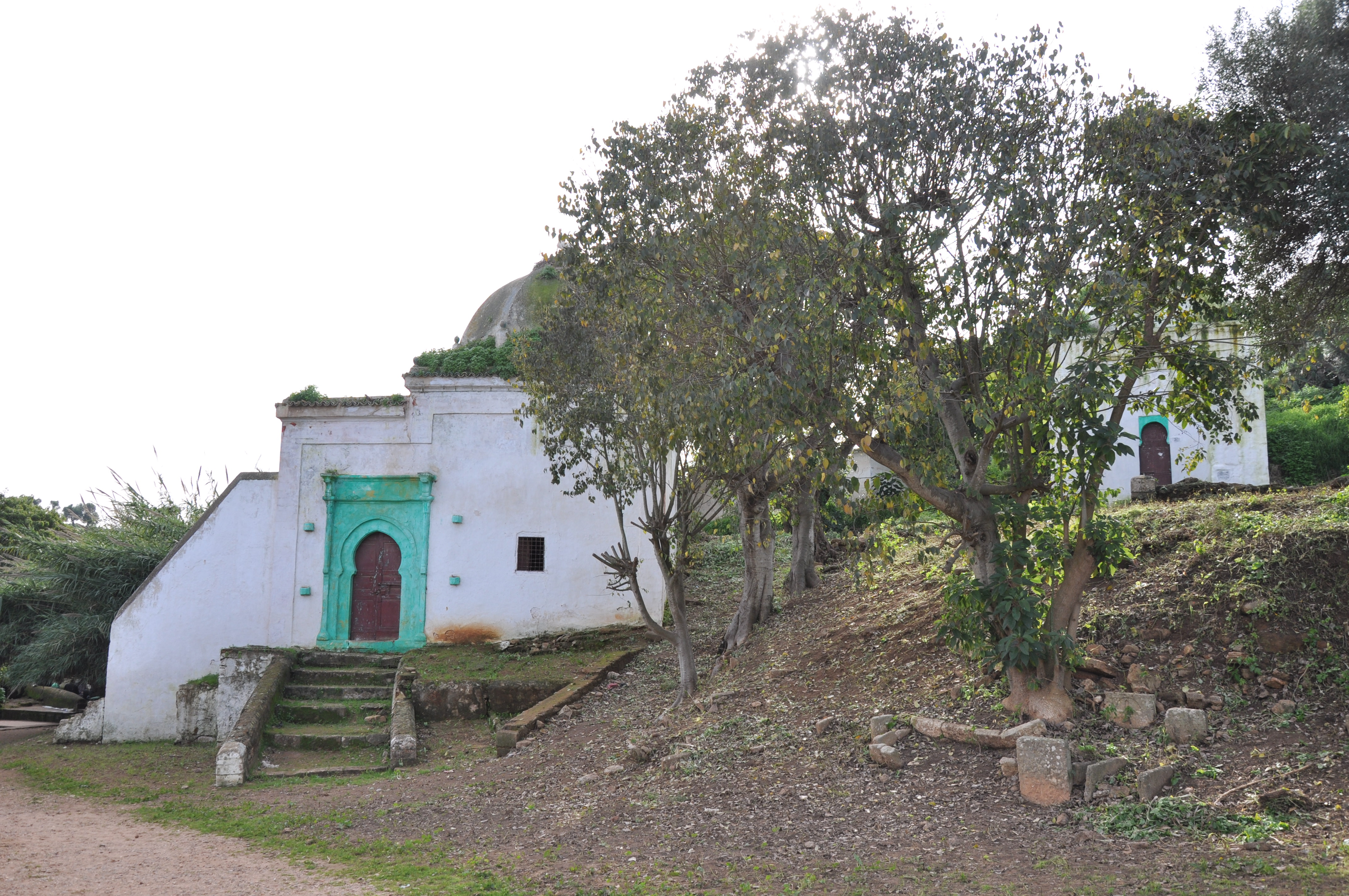
Qubba mausoleums of local saints, dating from later periods, near the Marinid complex

Despite this decline, the site acquired local religious importance over time. At some point, Sufis began to inhabit the site and the madrasa was reused as a zawiya (Sufi religious and educational center). The zawiya also became the object of a local pilgrimage, with locals believing that a visit here could be a substitute for the Hajj pilgrimage to Mecca for those who couldn't afford that long journey. As part of their visit, pilgrims performed a circumambulation (tawaf) of the madrasa's mihrab. Popular legends also grew around the tombs. The tomb of Shams al-Ḍuḥa came to be popularly known as the tomb of a girl named Lalla Chella, to which the site's name was popularly attributed. Some local beliefs, especially among women, associated beneficial maraboutic powers with some of the animals, like the eels and turtles, that lived in the pools here. For example, it was believed that feeding the eels could aid fertility and childbirth. Legends about buried treasures also led to illegal excavations at times and pushed authorities in the 20th century to move some of the most important objects in the necropolis to museums in Rabat.

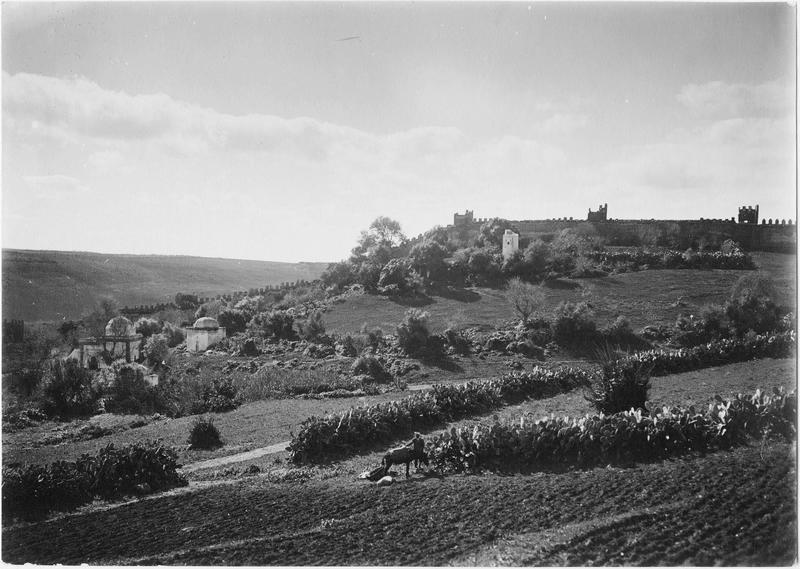
View of the site in 1916

The remains of the ancient Roman city were first identified in the late 19th century by French geographer Charles Tissot. The first investigation and study of the Islamic-era remains were carried out by Henri Basset and Évariste Lévi-Provençal in 1922. The first excavations of the Roman city were carried out in 1929–30 under the supervision of Jules Borély, head of the Service des Beaux-Arts, an agency of the French Protectorate in Morocco at that time. This initial work cleared away vegetation from the ruined mosque and unearthed a large portion of the "monumental" Roman quarter visible today. Excavations did not take place again until 1958, after Moroccan independence, when the head of the Service des Antiquités du Maroc, Maurice Euzennat, appointed Jean Boube to begin a new campaign of excavations. Excavations continued on and off until 1996, unearthing the rest of the structures now visible.

Today, the site of Chellah has been converted to a garden and tourist attraction. It is part of the metropolitan area of Rabat. The site, as part of historic Rabat, was listed by UNESCO as a World Heritage Site in 2012. It is also notable for hosting a large colony of storks, who nest in the trees as well as on the minaret of the ruined zawiya.

On 3 November 2023, a team of Moroccan archaeologists and researchers discovered the first port district of the Roman era in Morocco, dating from the first to the second century AD, along with the first life-sized headless statue of a female goddess found in Morocco since 1960.

== The Roman remains ==
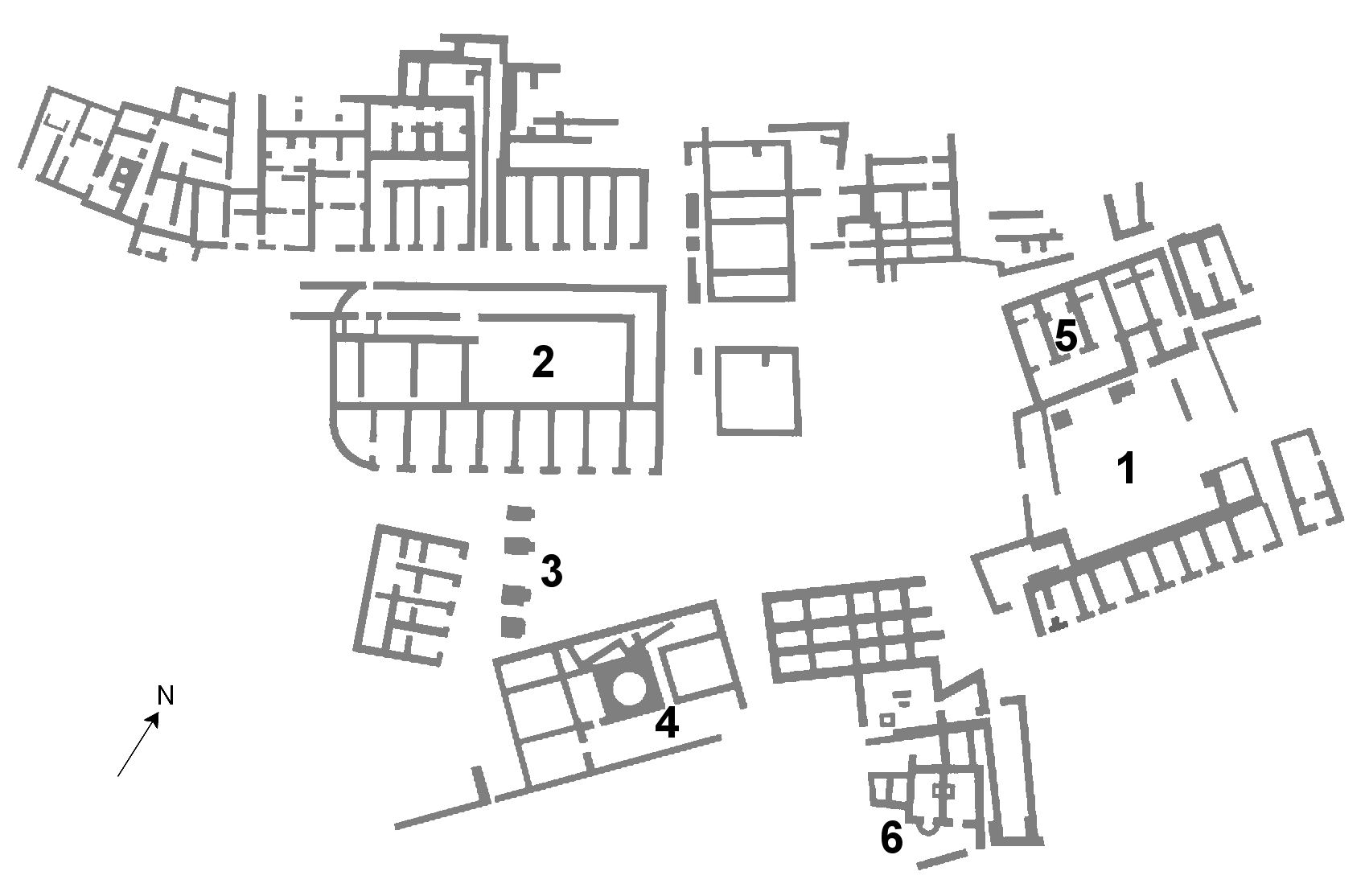
Plan of the Roman site: 1) Forum, 2) Capitolium temple, 3) Triumphal arch, 4) Curia or basilica with nymphaeum 5) Temple with five cellae, 6) Baths

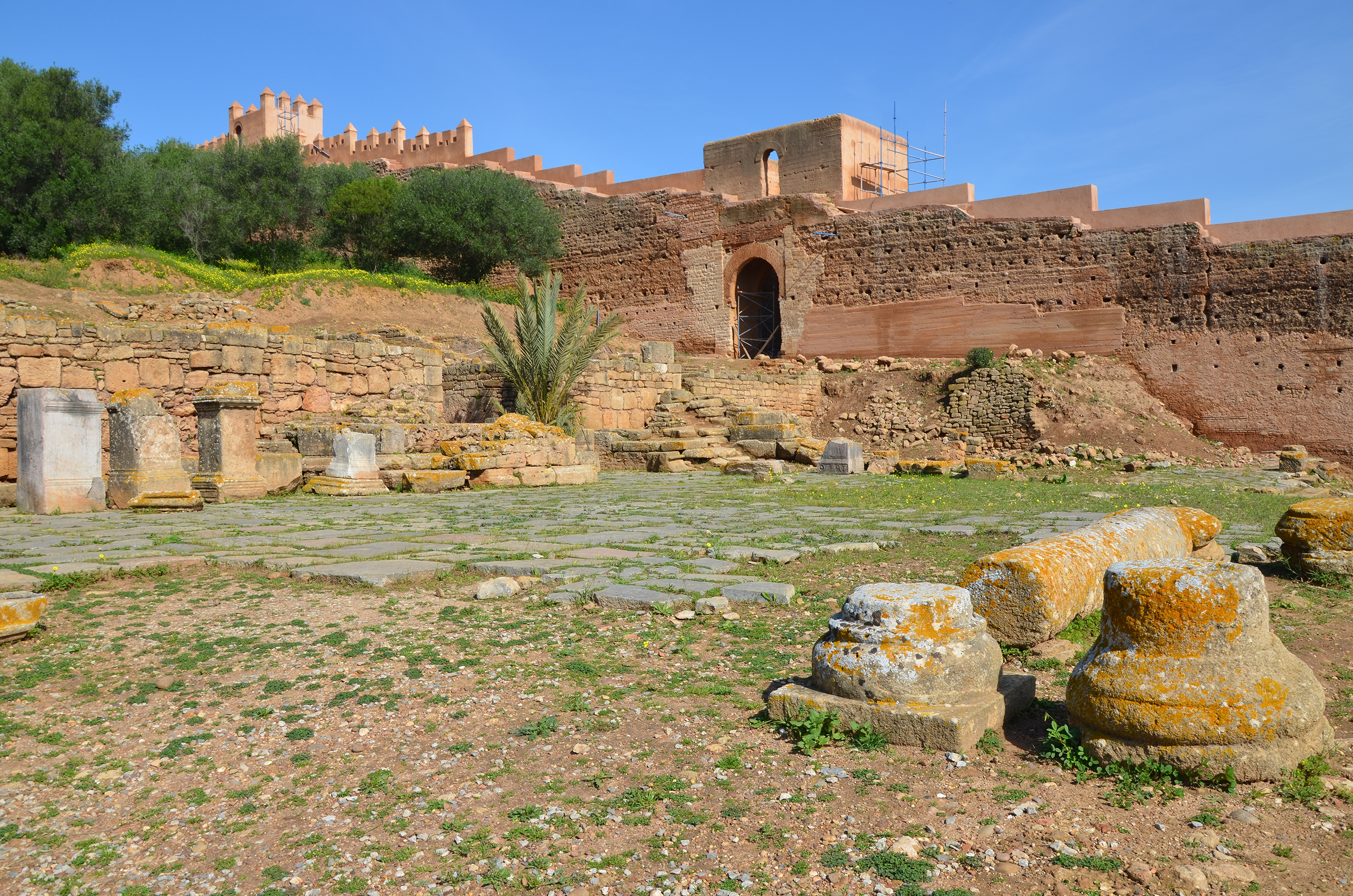
Ruins of the forum at the eastern end of the site today (with Marinid walls standing behind)

The excavated portion of the Roman city covers about 1.2 hectares and corresponds to the "monumental" district around the forum, where the most important public buildings stood. The city was built on a sloped site and consequently its buildings were constructed upon a series of artificial terraces, with at least three terraces visible today. Streets were laid out in a regular grid and the two most important streets were the decumanus maximus and the cardo maximus.

At the eastern end of the excavated area is the forum. It is flanked on its north side by a structure standing on higher ground which has been identified as a "temple" with five cellae. On the south side of the plaza, on a lower level, is a long building with nine rooms, possibly tabernae (shops), that open onto another street. The dating of the temple and the adjoining forum has been debated. Jean Boube dated the temple to the mid-first century BC, which would make it a Mauretanian structure (before the region was annexed as a Roman province). Statues of the Mauretanian client kings Juba II and Ptolemy have been found here, leading Boube to suggest the temple was originally dedicated to them. Other archeologists have argued that it belongs instead to the Roman period (after annexation). More recent studies have again suggested a pre-Roman dating, based on the construction techniques present.

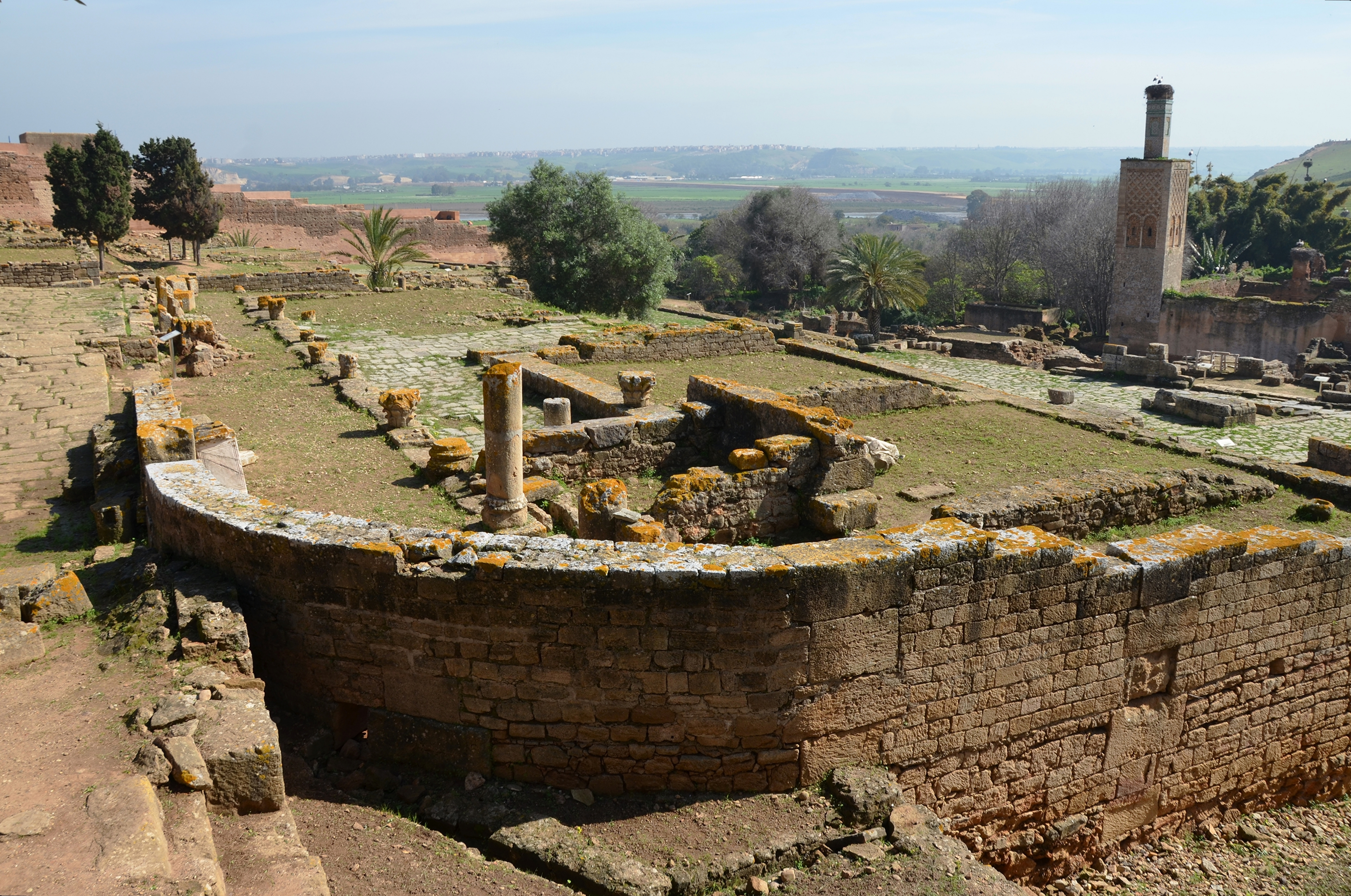
Ruins of the capitolium temple

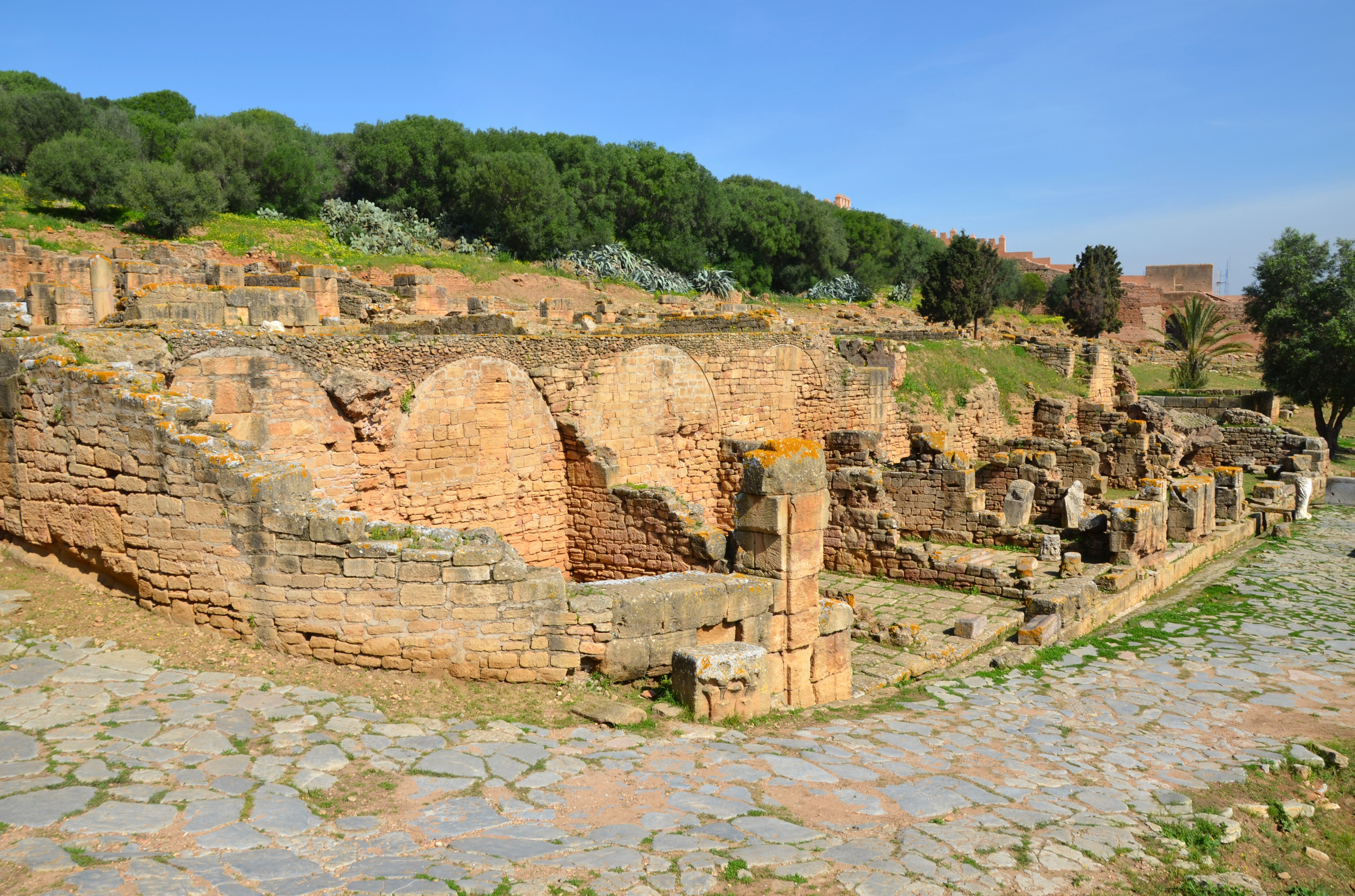
Ruins of tabernae that were built under the temple's south side

On the west side of the forum is another wide paved space which may have been an additional forum (forum adiectum) or a part of the decumanus maximus. Boube dated it to the reigns of Trajan (r. 98–117) and Hadrian (r. 117–138). The largest structure here, on the northwest side, is the capitolium or capitoline temple. The temple is built on two levels and has a rectangular floor plan, measuring about 48 metres by 26 metres, with rounded corners on its west side. On the lower level were nine vaulted tabernae chambers which opened onto the paved area next to the temple and formed a part of the temple's substructure. The upper level was the temple proper, consisting of single cella and a pronaos (vestibule chamber), elevated on a podium and surrounded on three sides by a portico of 32 columns. The parts of the temple that were built above the tabernae have collapsed. Roman inscriptions found on site confirm that the temple was built in the time of Hadrian and possibly inaugurated around 120 AD. Its construction was funded by a private citizen, a military official named C. Hosidius Severus, who gifted it to the people of the city.

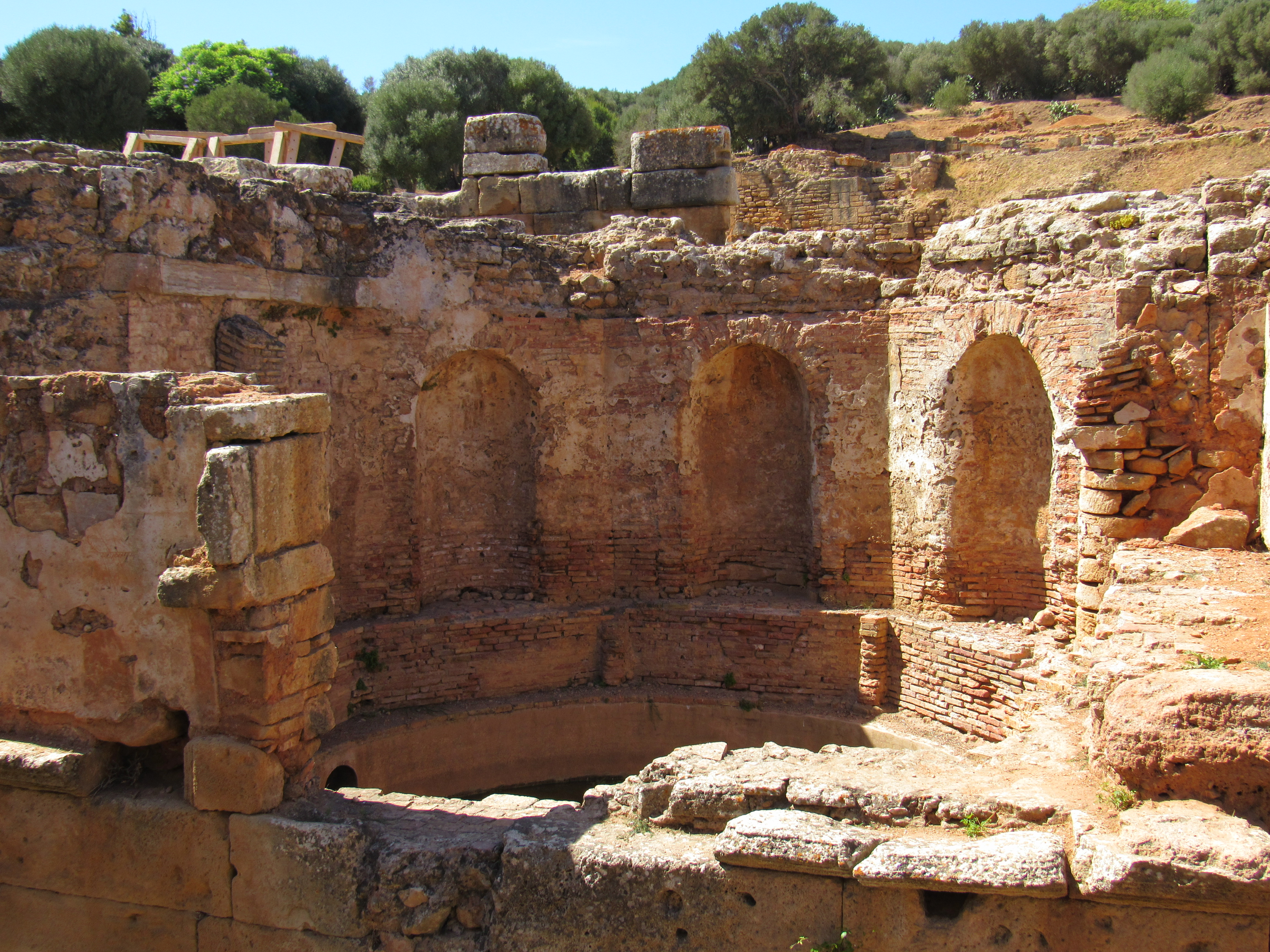
Ruins of the nymphaeum in the southern part of the site

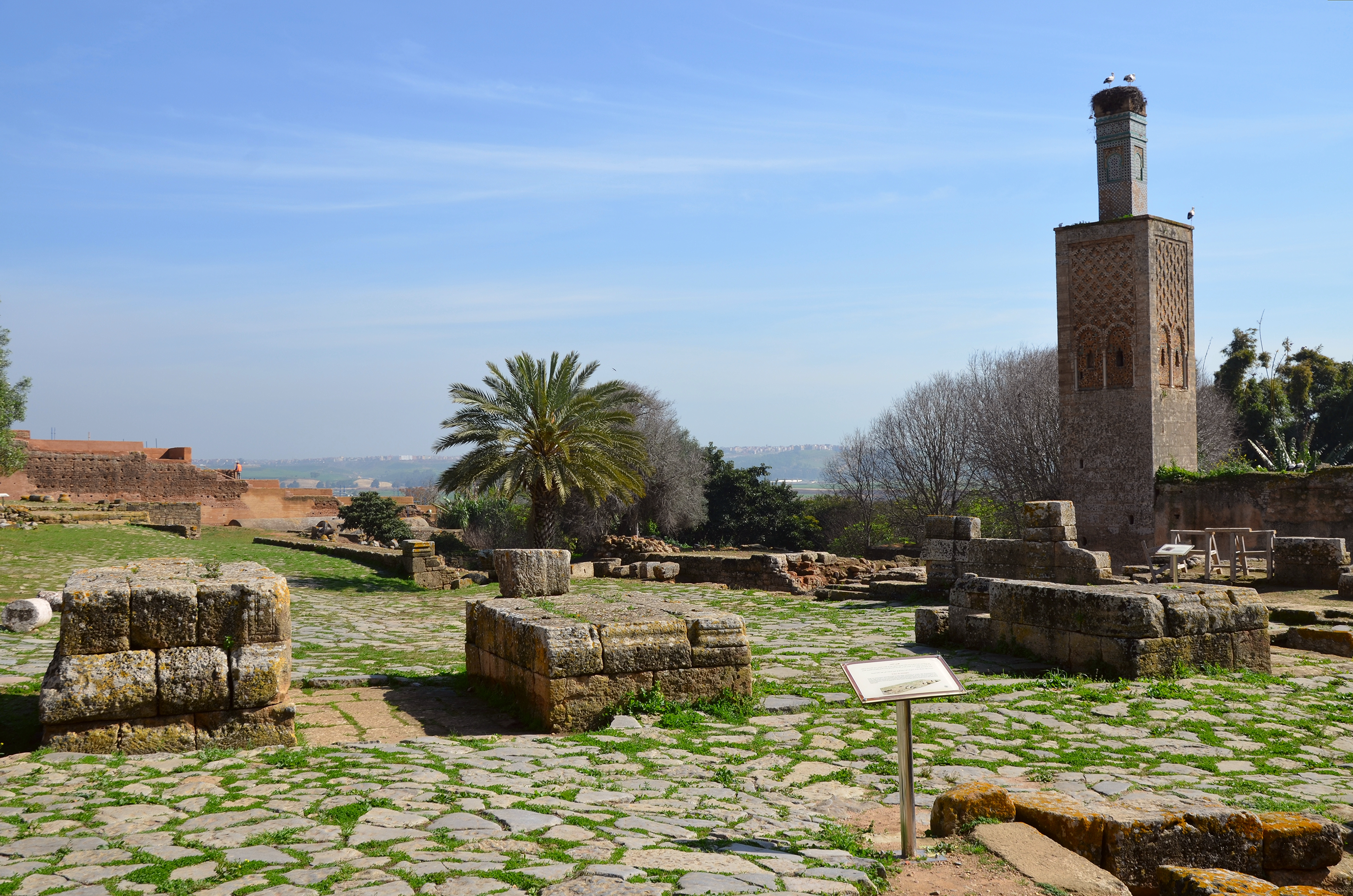
Remains of the foundations of the triumphal arch

The other major building in this western area is located directly opposite the capitolium, to the south and near the perimeter wall of the Marinid religious complex. This building is poorly preserved and has been tentatively identified as either a curia (the Curia Ulpia) or as a basilica. Its construction is likely contemporary with that of the nearby capitolium. It has a rectangular floor plan measuring about 32 by 19 metres. At its center is a large octagonal opening, with niches set along its interior walls, that corresponds to an underground nymphaeum that once extended further up to the ground level of the building.

Between the capitolium and the curia/basilica are the remains of a triumphal arch. Only the base of the arch remains and therefore not much is known for certain about it. It may date from the time of Hadrian, like the surrounding buildings, but another hypothesis has dated it to around the time of Antoninus Pius (r. 138–161). Various other structures are scattered around the site, including two more structures identified as temples to the east of the capitolium. Remains of a Roman bath are found in the eastern part of the site, between the Marinid madrasa and the Islamic-era bathhouse.

== The Marinid necropolis ==
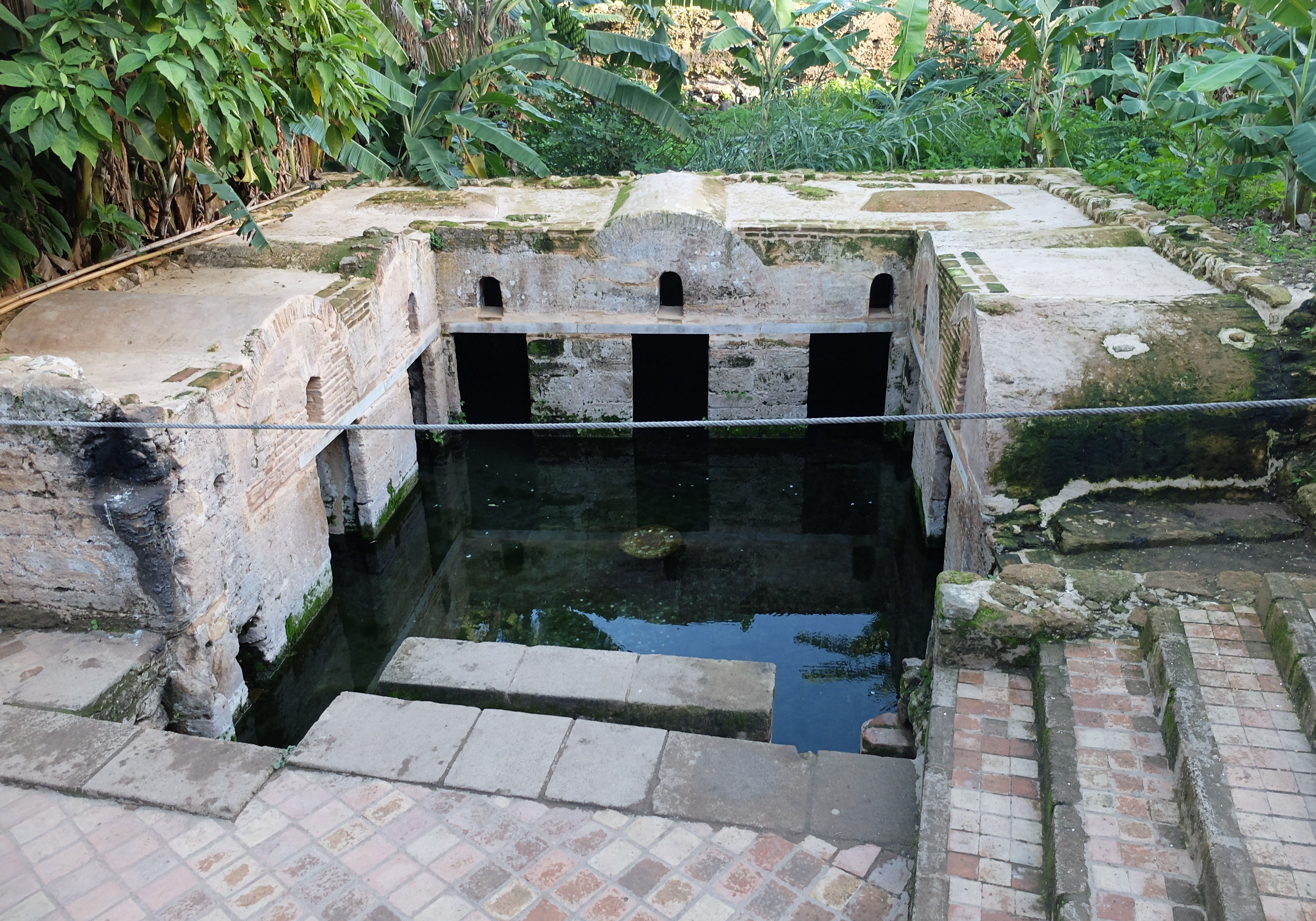
The pool at Chellah, originally an ablutions facility for the mosque

The area enclosed by the Marinid walls is roughly pentagonal in shape and is smaller than the former Roman city. Most of the Marinid structures inside are contained within a religious complex in the southeastern part of the enclosure, called the khalwa (Arabic: خلوة). Outside this complex there is also a hammam in the far eastern corner of the enclosure and a residential complex located just inside the main gate. The khalwa consists principally of a mosque, a madrasa, a cemetery with multiple mausoleums, and several courtyards. Its layout is irregular and complicated due to the addition of various elements over different periods. On its southwest side is a pool whose water comes from the spring of 'Ayn al-Janna (Arabic: عين ألجنّا, lit. 'spring/source of paradise'). The pool was originally the latrines and ablutions facility of the 13th-century mosque, but at some point it became submerged due to water seeping in from underground and it is now inhabited by eels.

=== Walls and main gate ===
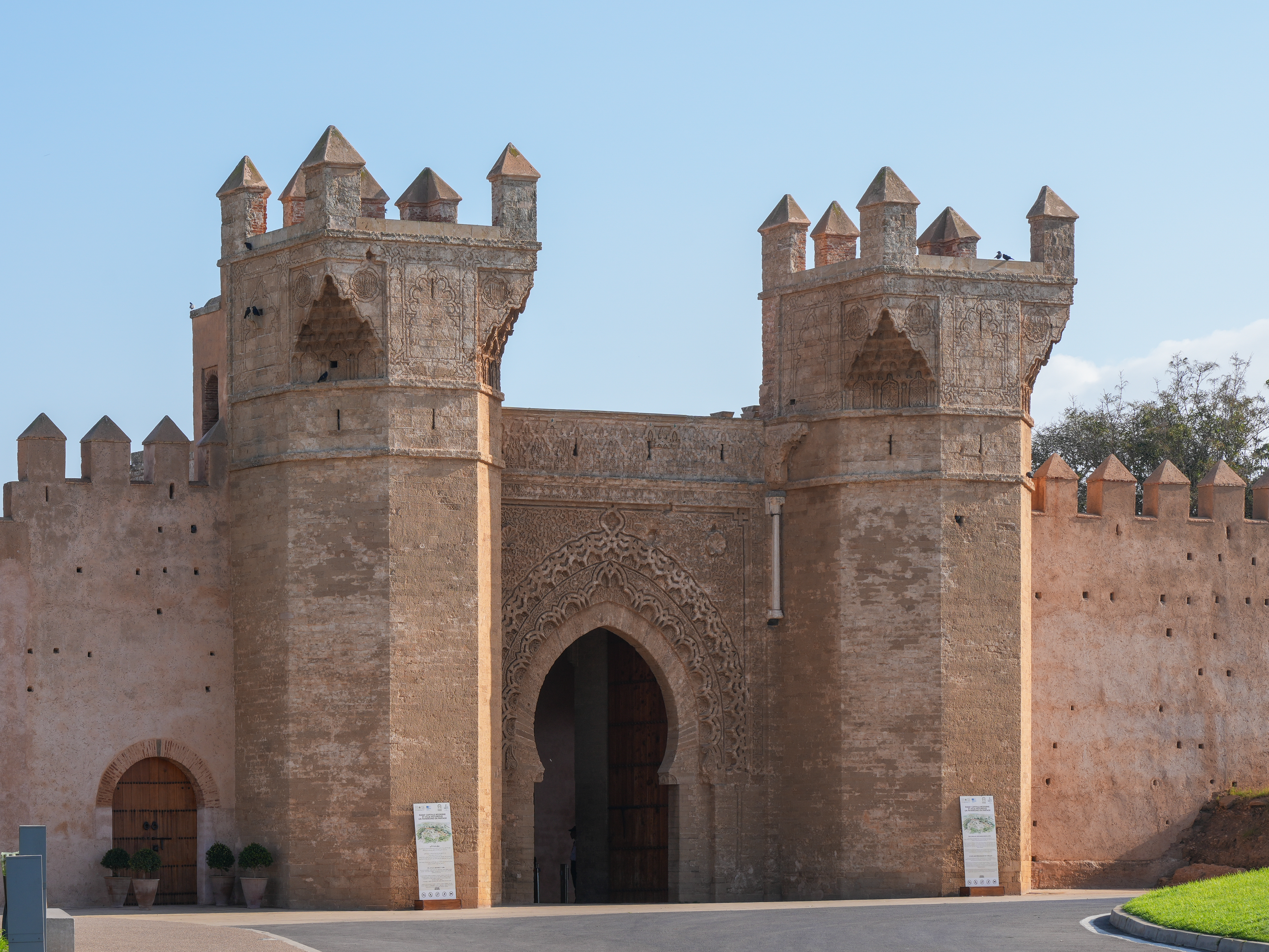
The main gate of Chellah, completed in 1339 by Abu al-Hasan

The rampart walls surrounding the site are built in rammed earth (or pisé). They are pierced by three gates and interspersed with defensive towers. The towers typically have a square base and contain three levels inside. The most monumental gate is in the northwestern part of the enclosure and is built in brick and cut stone with carved ornamentation. It is one of the most exceptional gates built by the Marinids, demonstrating influences from earlier monumental gates built by the Almohads (e.g. Bab er-Rouah and Bab Oudaya). The gate's façade is decorated with two polylobed arch motifs around the pointed horseshoe-shaped archway. The spandrels of the arch are filled with a foliate arabesque motif featuring a carved shell at their centers. The whole composition is framed by a rectangular frieze (an alfiz) containing a Kufic Arabic inscription that details the construction of the gate. The gate is flanked by two towers that have prismatic or semi-octagonal bases but are crowned with square turrets. The transition from the semi-octagonal body of the tower to the square turret above is accomplished with the use of muqarnas in the corners. Inside, the gate has a bent passage that turns 90 degrees. The inner façade of the gate, facing towards the religious complex, is decorated with a simpler version of the motifs seen on the outside of the gate.

=== The khalwa (religious and funerary complex) ===
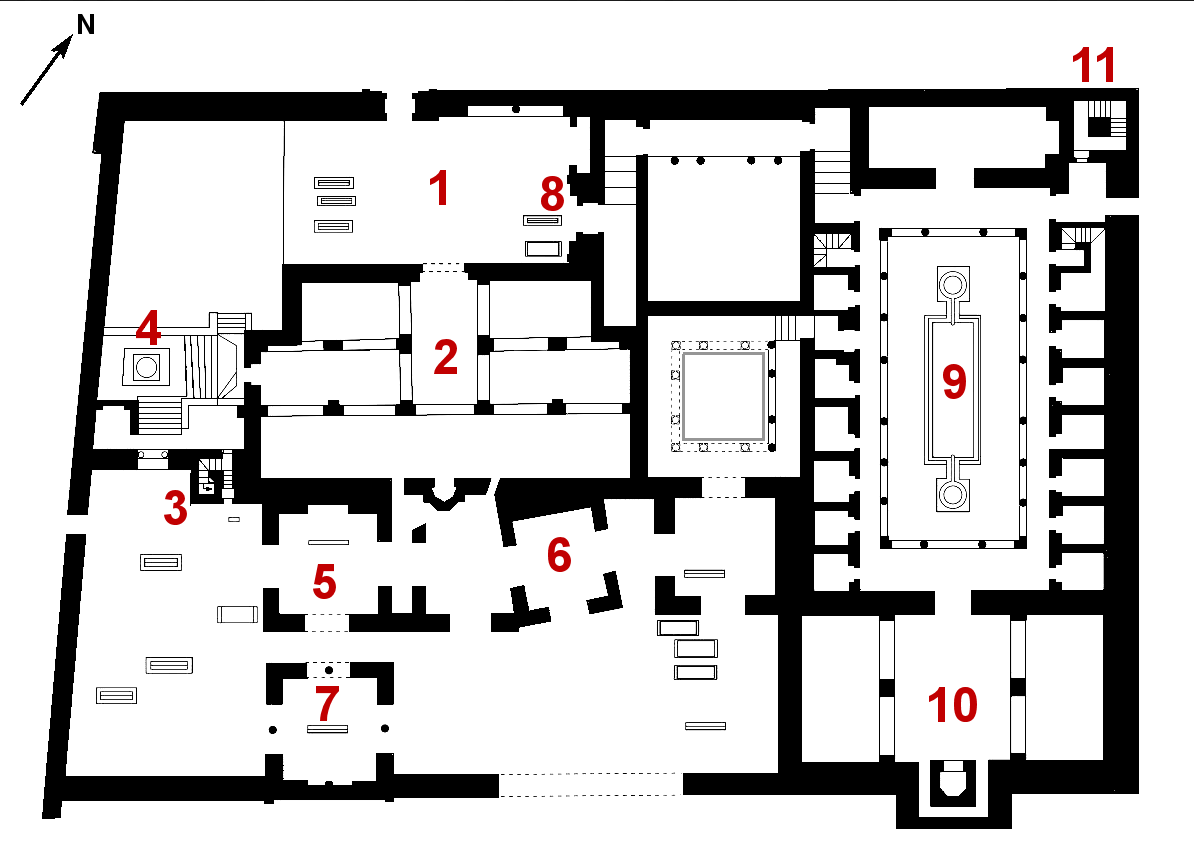
Plan of the Marinid religious complex: 1) entrance courtyard, 2) mosque, 3) minaret of the mosque, 4) well or basin, 5) Tomb of Abu Sa'id, 6) Tomb of Shams al-Ḍuḥa, 7) Tomb of Abu al-Hasan, 8) gate to madrasa, 9) madrasa, 10) prayer hall of madrasa, 11) minaret of madrasa

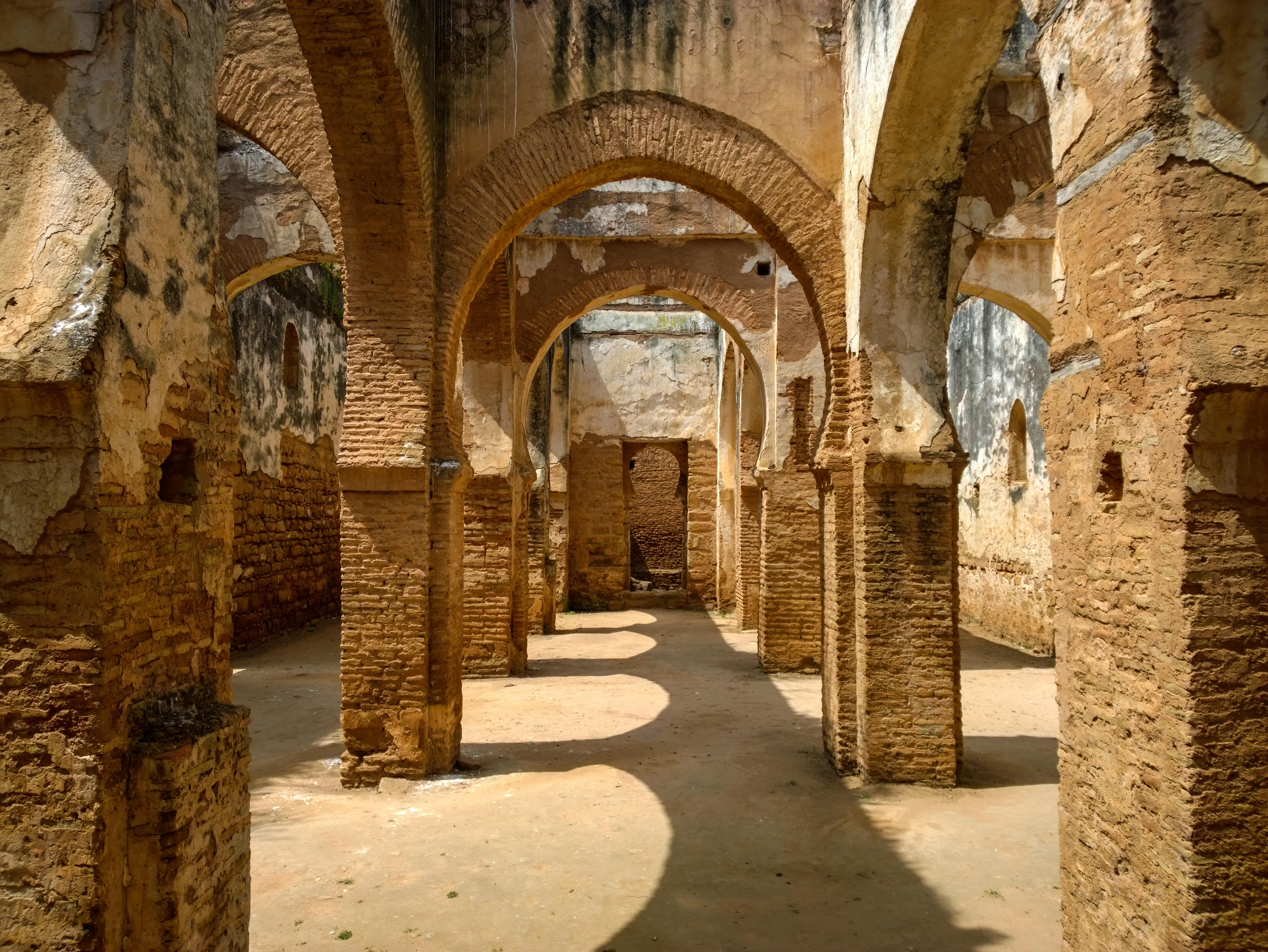
The mosque of the Marinid complex (built circa 1284)

The mosque, located in the center of the southwestern half of the complex, is a hypostyle hall. It is divided into three naves by two rows of horseshoe arches. Two more rows of arches, perpendicular to the others, delimit a central aisle running towards the mihrab on the southeastern wall. At the mosque's southwest corner is a small, partly ruined minaret with a square base and polylobed-arch windows. Outside the mosque, near the minaret, is a small water basin or well that was used for ablutions fed by a local spring. Behind the qibla wall of the mosque, on its southeast side, is a rawda (Arabic: الروضة) or garden cemetery. It consists of a long enclosure with at least four ruined mausoleums and a number of other graves scattered across the open space. According to Basset and Lévi-Provençal, the three mausoleums adjoined to the back wall of the mosque include the tomb of Sultan Abu Sa'id (d. 1331) and the tomb of Shams al-Ḍuḥa (d. 1349). Each tomb is a qubba or square chamber that was probably once covered by a dome or a pyramidal tiled roof, similar to other mausoleums in Morocco. These tombs are largely ruined and contain only small fragments of their former decoration.

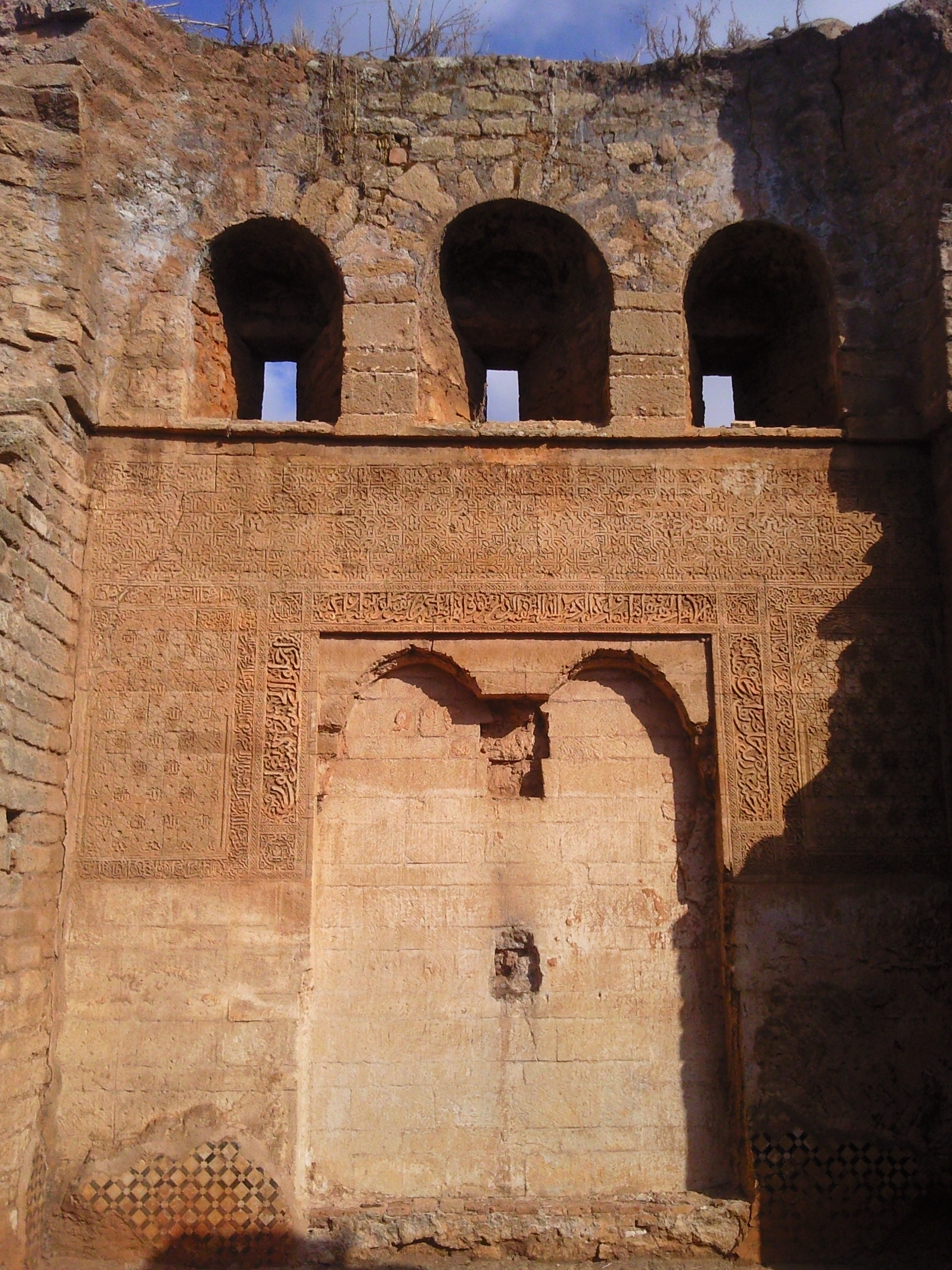
The interior back wall of Abu al-Hasan's mausoleum

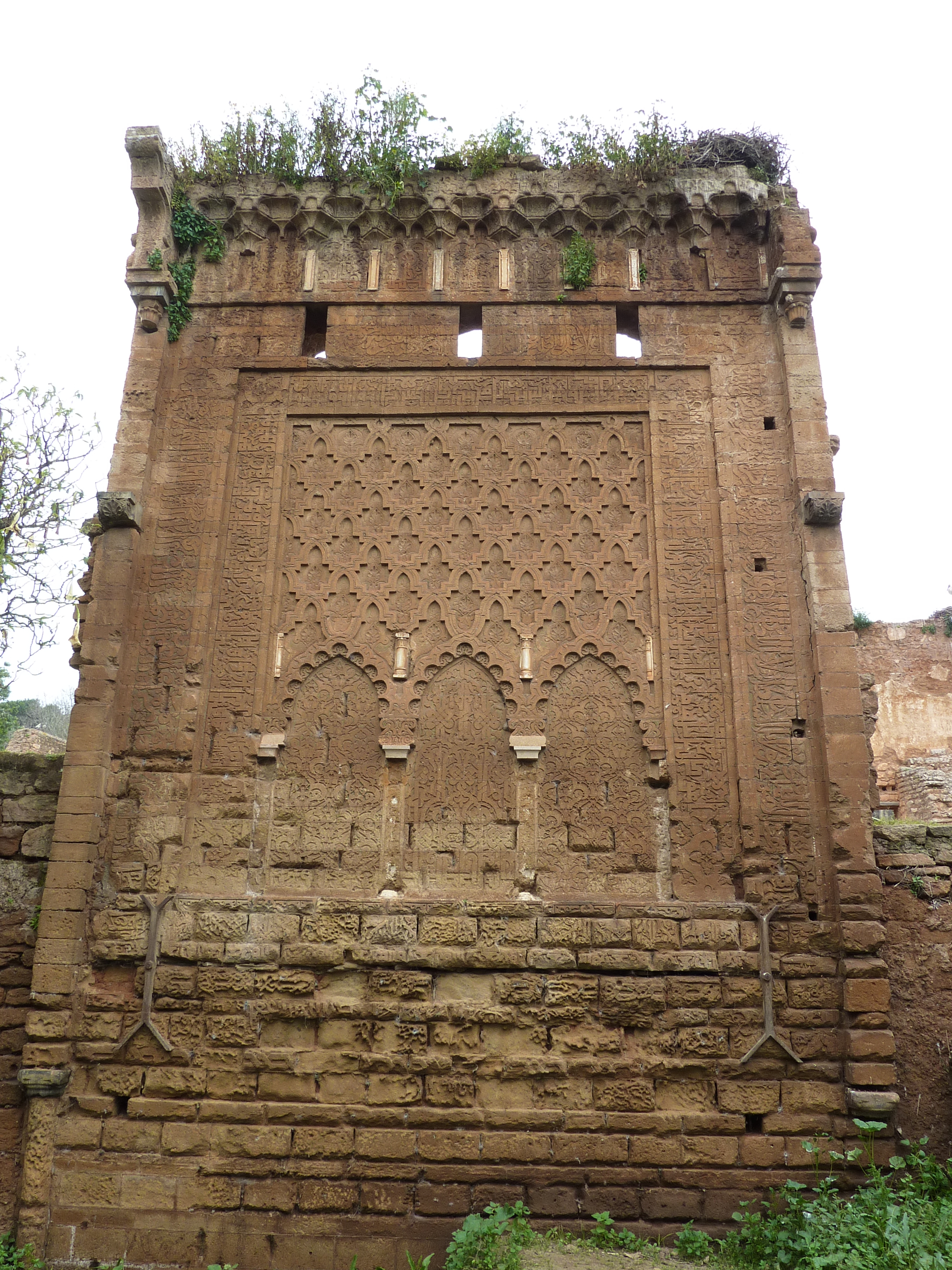
The exterior wall of Abu al-Hasan's mausoleum

The ruined qubba further south, set against the perimeter wall of the complex, belongs to Sultan Abu al-Hasan (d. 1351). This is the most richly decorated tomb in the complex and is better-preserved than the other tombs. Its remaining walls are covered in elaborate low-relief decoration carved in stone. The back wall inside the mausoleum has a central double-arched niche framed by an epigraphic frieze containing verses 30 and 31 of Surah XVI from the Qur'an. This in turn is surrounded by geometric decoration and more epigraphic decoration. Zellij (mosaic tilework) decorated the lower portions of the wall. Three windows are pierced above this. The exterior side of this wall, facing out from the complex, is carved with two rectangular friezes, one filled with an ornate Kufic inscription and the other with a Naskhi (cursive) inscription. The Kufic inscription includes verse 185 of Surah III, while the Naskhi inscription is a dedication to Abu al-Hasan. These two friezes enclose a central rectangular zone filled with sebka decoration above three blind polylobed arches with small colonettes. The negative spaces inside the sebka pattern are each carved with another motif including a shell or palmette, while the blind arches below are filled with arabesques (for the side arches) and with a repeating calligram in "knotted" Kufic (for the central arch). Above this runs another small blind arcade and a muqarnas cornice above it.

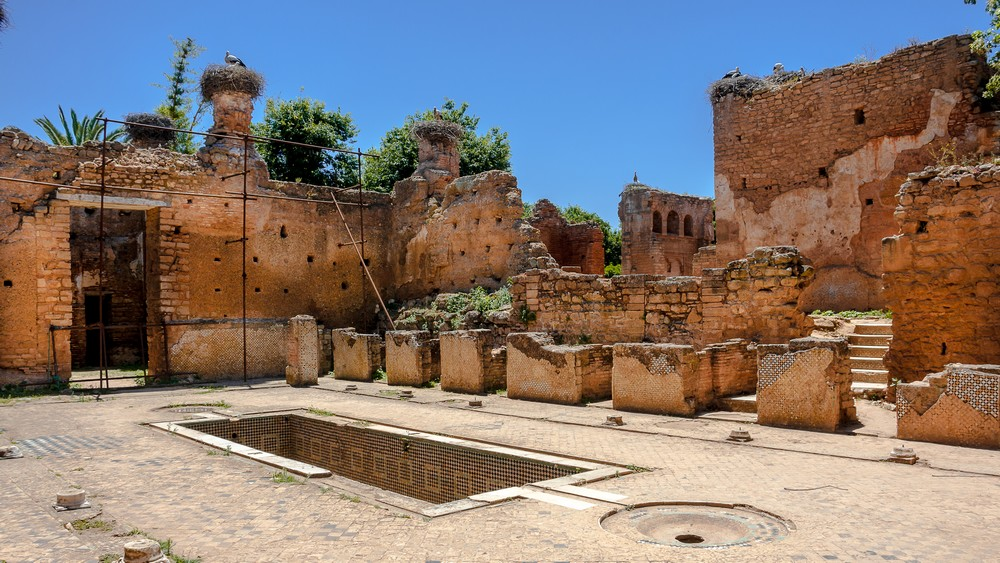
The courtyard of the ruined madrasa/zawiya (mid-14th century)

Most of the northeastern half of the complex is occupied by a building which scholars believe was most likely a madrasa, though two surviving inscriptions refer to it as a "zawiya". Similar to other madrasas of the era, it consists of an elongated rectangular courtyard with a rectangular pool at its center. At each end of the basin are two small circular basins with fountains that provided water for the pool. The courtyard was once surrounded by a peristyle portico supported by marble columns, no longer standing. Behind the portico, on the two long sides of the courtyard, are a number of small rooms which served as sleeping quarters for students. Two staircases provided access to an upper floor above this, probably with a similar layout. The courtyard was paved and decorated with intricate zellij (mosaic tilework), parts of which survive. At the southeast end of the courtyard a doorway leads to a rectangular hall that served as a prayer room. A mihrab was set in the back wall here. Unusually, the mihrab is surrounded by a narrow passage that runs around and behind it. This passage may have been used by pilgrims who circumambulated it. At the northeastern corner of the madrasa is a preserved minaret, about 15 metres tall and prominently visible from most of the site. Its main shaft has a traditional square base and its four facades are each decorated with a sebka composition above two blind polylobed arches (each enclosing small windows). The negative spaces within these motifs are filled with zellij tile decoration.

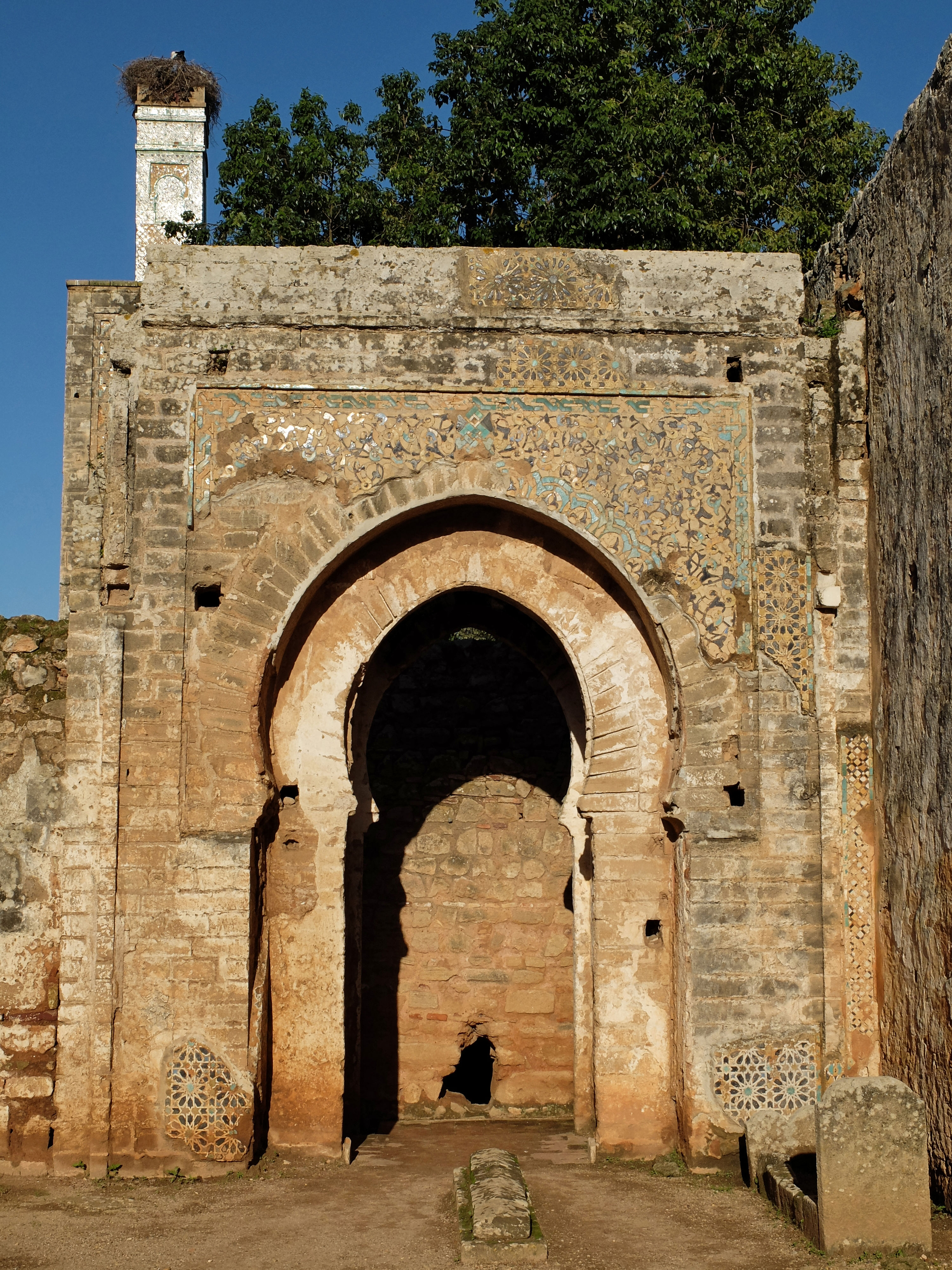
The zellij-decorated gateway to the madrasa

In addition to Abu al-Hasan's mausoleum, one of the most exceptional examples of decoration in the complex is the gateway that leads towards the madrasa from the forecourt on the north side of the mosque. The gate, a horseshoe arch, is framed by a rectangular frieze or alfiz filled with geometric star patterns in zellij tiling. The spandrels of the archway are filled with arabesque motifs and a polylobed arch motif, similar to the monumental main gate of the complex, but instead of carved stone they are executed in highly colourful zellij tiling. The decoration of this gateway also has similarities to the gate of the Sidi Boumediene Complex in Tlemcen (present-day Algeria), suggesting that the same team of artisans may have been involved in both designs.

=== Hammam ===
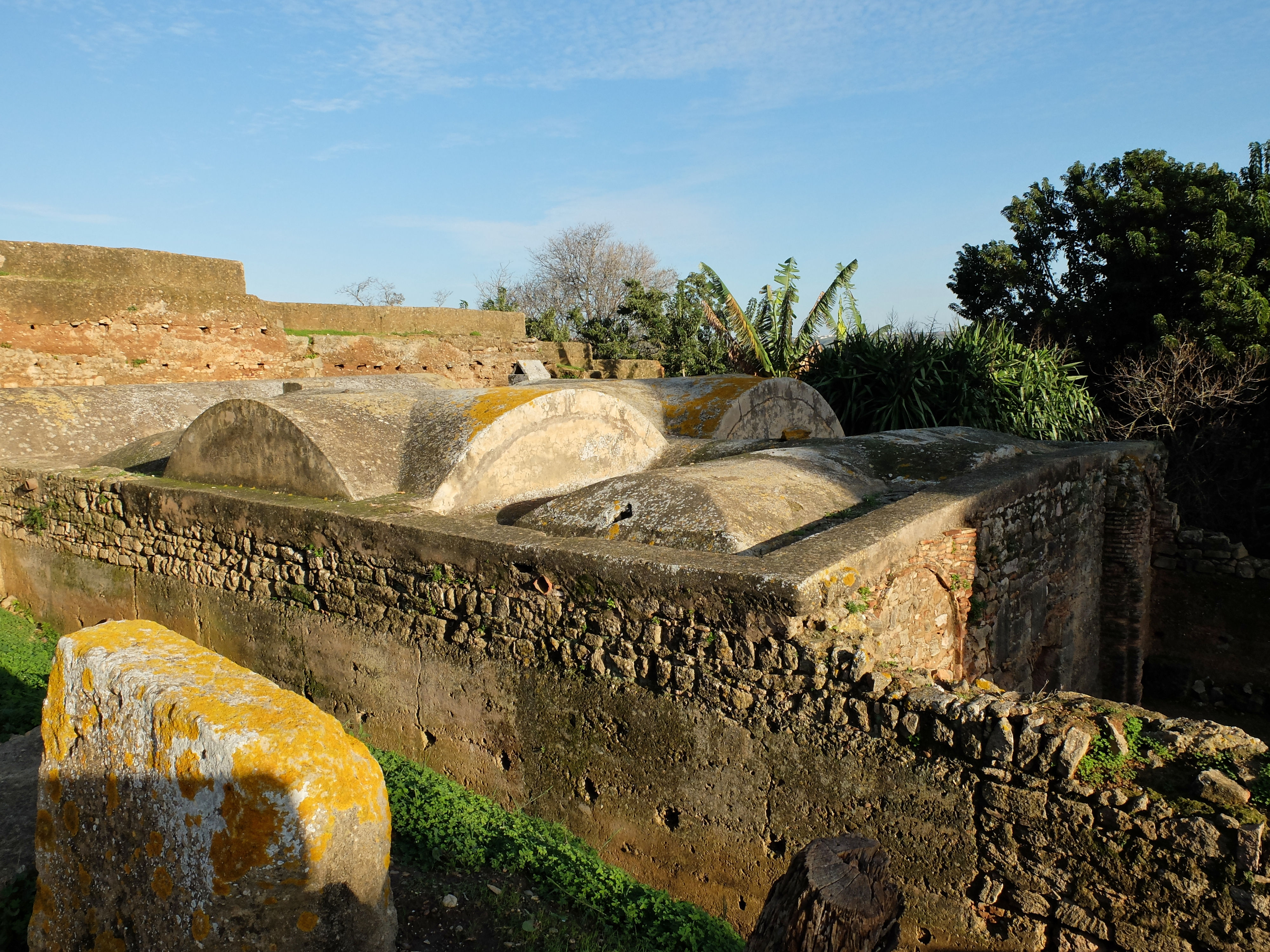
The Marinid hammam (14th century)

The hammam (Islamic bathhouse) of Chellah has a roughly rectangular floor plan measuring 28.5 by 10.4 metres. Henri Terrasse estimated that its construction was contemporary with the other major Marinid structures in Chellah and that it took place between 1339 and 1358. It was restored in the 20th century. It shares general similarities with other historic hammams in this part of the Islamic world. It consists of a changing room near the entrance (equivalent to the Roman apodyterium), followed by a cold room (equivalent to the frigidarium), a warm room (equivalent to the tepidarium), and a hot room (equivalent to the caldarium). Another chamber behind the hot room contained the furnace that heated the baths and its water via the traditional hypocaust system. A small chamber near the changing room probably contained the latrines. The hammam was entered from a gate at its west corner. The changing room consisted of a central square space flanked by two small rectangular galleries divided from it by a row of arches supported by columns. This room was probably the most decorated space in the building, though no decoration has been preserved today. The central square space was probably covered by an ornate wooden vault ceiling while the galleries were covered by groin vaults. The cold room and hot room are both roofed by groin vaults, while the warm room between them is larger and is roofed by two cloister vaults.

=== Shrines of Sufi mystics ===
Several shrines dedicated to Sufi mystics are present in the necropolis as well, towards the southern part of the area. These shrines were built at a later date, and appear to be grouped together. One of such buildings is a shrine containing the tomb of Sidi Yahya ibn Yunus, a mystic believed to have lived in the 7th century.

== Archeological artifacts ==
The Museum of History and Civilizations in Rabat houses some Roman-era artifacts from Sala Colonia. The museum also holds several Marinid-period pieces from the necropolis. One of these is the tombstone of Abu Ya'qub Yusuf, a rectangular marble slab which was a spolia from Roman-era Hispania Baetica, as seen in the Roman inscription on the back side which mentions a Roman governor of that province named Aulus Caecina Tacitus from the second half of the 3rd century AD. The stone was initially reused for an Umayyad fountain in Cordoba, probably in the late 10th or early 11th century, before it was apparently moved to North Africa and eventually reused by the Marinids, who carved the other side of it with the sultan's funerary inscription. The same museum also holds the tombstones of Abu al-Hasan and his wife Shams al-Ḍuḥa. These tombstones were maqabriyyas: marble tombstones shaped approximately like a triangular prism and laid horizontally over the grave. Both are richly carved with elaborate Arabic inscriptions that record their names, titles, and the details of their burials. A number of Marinid-period marble capitals are also housed at the museum.

== Music venue ==
Since 2005, the ruins of Chellah host an international "Festival of Jazz" each year, called Jazz au Chellah. Additionally, it is currently home to a venue of the annual Mawazine music festival in Rabat, which showcases popular contemporary music from around the world.

== See also ==
- Volubilis
