= Salah, Iran =

Salah صلاح
- Village
- Location within Iran
- Coordinates: 36°22′16″N 53°27′11″E
- Country: Iran
- Province: Mazandaran
- County: Sari
- Bakhsh: Chahardangeh
- Rural District: Garmab

Population (2016)
  - Total: 107
- Time zone: UTC+3:30 (IRST)

Salah (Persian: صلاح, also Romanized as Şalāḩ; also known as Şalāt and Şelāt) is a village in Garmab Rural District, Chahardangeh District, Sari County, Mazandaran Province, Iran. At the 2006 census, its population was 122, in 24 families. In 2016, its population was 107, in 35 households.
