= Salah (name) =

Salah, Salaah, or Saalah (Arabic: صلاح, romanized: Ṣalāḥ, pronounced [sˤɑˈlɑːħ]) is a masculine given name and surname of Arabic and Biblical origins. Its meaning in the Bible is 'mission' or 'sending', whereas the Arabic meaning is 'righteousness', 'goodness', or 'peace'. Notable people with the name include:

== Given name ==
=== Saalah ===
- Saalah Yusuf Sutan Mangkuto (1901–1974), Indonesian politician

=== Salaah ===
- Salaah Al-Yahyaei (born 1998), Omani footballer

=== Salah ===
- Salah (biblical figure), an ancestor of the Israelites
- Salah (dancer) (born 1979), French hip-hop dancer
- Salah Abdallah (born 1955), Egyptian actor
- Salah Abdel-Haq (born 1945), Egyptian politician
- Salah Abdel-Shafi (born 1962), Palestinian economist and ambassador
- Salah Abdeslam (born 1989), Belgian Islamic terrorist
- Salah Adel (born 1995), Sudanese footballer
- Salah Ibrahim Ahmed (born 1947), Iraqi footballer
- Salah Ali, Bahraini politician
- Salah bin Ghanim Al Ali (born 1966), Qatari politician
- Salah Omar al-Ali (1938–2024), Iraqi politician and diplomat
- Salah Ameidan (born 1982), Saharawi long distance runner
- Salah Amin (born 1981), Egyptian footballer
- Salah Ashour (born 1987), Egyptian footballer
- Salah Assad (born 1958), Algerian footballer and sports manager
- Salah Atef (born 1991), Egyptian footballer
- Salah Bachir (1955–2026), Canadian philanthropist and businessman
- Salah ibn Al Badiya (1937–2019), Sudanese singer, composer, and actor
- Salah Al Bahar (born 1970), Iraqi singer and composer
- Salah Bakour (born 1982), Algerian footballer
- Salah Al Bandar (born 1955), British-Sudanese known for role in revealing the Bandargate scandal in Bahrain
- Salah al-Bardawil (1959–2025), Palestinian politician
- Salah Basha (born 2003), Italian-Egyptian footballer
- Salah Ba'uthman, Saudi Quranic scholar, university academic, and Quran reciter
- Salah Jassim Beden (born 1956), Iraqi boxer
- Salah Benlabed (born 1950), Algerian architect, academic, novelist, and poet
- Salah Abdul Rasool Al Blooshi (born 1981), Bahraini Guantanamo detainee
- Salah Bouakouir (1908–1961), Algerian politician
- Salah Boubnider (1929–2005), Algerian Army colonel
- Salah Bouchekriou (born 1962), Algerian handball player and coach
- Salah Bouzrara (born 2000), French footballer
- Salah Al Budair (born 1970), Saudi imam
- Salah Busir (1925–1973), Libyan politician, journalist, and historian
- Salah Chaoua (1946–2020), Tunisian footballer
- Salah Choheili (born 1952), Iranian-Australian Mandaean priest
- Salah Choudhury (born 1965/66), Bangladeshi journalist
- Salah Dessouki (1922–2011), Egyptian Olympic fencer
- Salah Elmur (born 1966), Sudanese painter, graphic designer, author, and filmmaker
- Salah Ezzedine (born 1962), Lebanese businessman
- Salah Fadl (1938–2022), Egyptian academic, writer, and translator
- Salah Fakroun (born 1999), Libyan footballer
- Salah Falah, Lebanese football player, coach, and referee
- Salah Farah (died 2016), Kenyan teacher
- Salah Farhat (1894–1979), Tunisian politician
- Salah Farzit (1953–2026), Tunisian singer and composer
- Salah Fettouh (born 1948), Moroccan sprinter
- Salah Ali Al-Ghali (died 2015), Sudanese politician
- Salah Gosh (born 1957), Sudanese Army general
- Salah Goudjil (born 1931), Algerian politician
- Salah Abu al-Haj (born 1974), Jordanian Islamic scholar and researcher
- Salah Halabi (1937–2014), Egyptian army officer
- Salah Al-Hamdani (born 1951), Iraqi poet, actor, and playwright
- Salah Hamouri (born 1985), French-Palestinian lawyer and field researcher
- Salah-Hassan Hanifes (1913–2002), Druze Israeli politician
- Salah Hasaballah, Egyptian politician
- Salah Hasarma (born 1974), Arab-Israeli footballer
- Salah M. Hassan, Sudanese historian, critic, and curator
- Salah Hissou (born 1972), Moroccan long-distance runner
- Salah Ahmed Ibrahim (1933–1993), Sudanese writer, poet, and diplomat
- Salah Isa (1939–2017), Egyptian journalist and historian
- Salah Jadid (1926–1993), Syrian general and political figure
- Salah Jahin (1930–1986), Egyptian poet, lyricist, playwright, and cartoonist
- Salah Jama (born 1980), Somali politician
- Salah Hassan Jama, Somali military official
- Salah Al-Jezoli (born 1985), Sudanese footballer
- Salah Khalaf (1933–1991), Palestinian politician
- Salah Labaki (1906–1955), Lebanese poet, scholar, journalist, and lawyer
- Salah Larbès (1952–2024), Algerian international footballer
- Salah El Mahdi (1925–2014), Tunisian musicologist, conductor, composer, flautist, music critic, and judge
- Salah Aboud Mahmoud (1942–2024), Iraqi officer
- Salah Majid (born 1932), Iraqi Olympic javelin thrower
- Salah Mansour (1923–1979), Egyptian film actor
- Salah Abdel Maqsoud (born 1958), Egyptian politician
- Salah Marghani, Libyan jurist
- Salah Al-Marzouq (born 1970), Kuwaiti handball player
- Salah Mejri (born 1986), Tunisian basketball player
- Salah Mezhiev (born 1977), Russian mufti
- Salah Abdel Moamen, Egyptian politician
- Salah Rashid Mohamed, Emirati footballer
- Salah Mohsen (born 1998), Egyptian footballer
- Salah Montaser (1933–2022), Egyptian writer and journalist
- Salah Sheikh Osman Mose (born 1957), Somali politician
- Salah Bey ben Mostefa (1725–1792), Bey of the Beylik of Constantine
- Salah Al-Mukhtar (born 1944), Iraqi politician
- Salah Nasr (1920–1982), Egyptian former head of the country's General Intelligence Directorate
- Salah Nemer (born 1992), Sudanese footballer
- Salah Niazi (born 1935), Iraqi poet and translator
- Salah Nooruddin (born 1963), Bahraini businessman
- Salah Obaya, Egyptian academic
- Salah Obeid, Iraqi footballer
- Salah El-Ouadie (born 1952), Moroccan poet and human rights activist
- Salah Qoqaiche (born 1967), Moroccan long-distance runner
- Salah Ragab (1935–2008), Egyptian drummer and jazz musician
- Salah Rais (1488–1568), Ottoman privateer
- Salah Rekik (born 1965), Tunisian judoka
- Salah El-Saadany (1943–2024), Egyptian actor
- Salah Abdel Sabour (1931–1981), Egyptian poet, editor, playwright, and essayist
- Salah Salem (1920–1962), Egyptian military officer and politician
- Salah Samadi (born 1976), Algerian footballer
- Salah Abu Seif (1915–1996), Egyptian film director
- Salah Shahrour (born 1988), Syrian footballer
- Salah Shehade (1953–2002), Palestinian Hamas movement member
- Salah Shokweir (born 1929), Egyptian boxer
- Salah Al-Deen Siamand (born 1981), Iraqi footballer
- Salah Sid (born 1950), Algerian-born British radio broadcaster, producer, and voice-over artist
- Salah Soliman (born 1990), Egyptian footballer
- Salah Stétié (1929–2020), Lebanese writer and poet
- Salah Suheimat (1914–1966), Jordanian politician
- Salah Sultan (born 1960), Egyptian Islamic scholar, preacher, and academic
- Salah Taher (1911–2007), Egyptian painter
- Salah Tarif (born 1954), Druze Israeli politician
- Salah Tizani (born 1927), Lebanese actor and comedian
- Salah Mohammed Tubaigy (born 1971), Saudi forensics officer
- Salah Al-Yahri (born 1995), Qatari footballer
- Salah Yaqub, Somali military general
- Salah ben Youssef (1907–1961), Tunisian politician
- Salah Zakaria (born 1999), Qatari footballer
- Salah Al-Zawawi (1937–2023), Palestinian politician and diplomat
- Salah Zulfikar (1926–1993), Egyptian actor

== Surname ==
- Arturo Salah (born 1949), Chilean football player, manager, and administrator
- Asher Salah (born 1967), Israeli historian
- Ebyan Mahamed Salah, Somalian diplomat
- Dana Salah (born 1989), Jordanian-Palestinian singer and songwriter
- Hussein Ahmed Salah (born 1956), Djiboutian long distance runner
- Ibn al-Salah (1181/82–1245), Arab hadith scholar and author
- Ibrahim Salah (footballer, born 1987) (born 1987), Egyptian footballer
- Kamal Al Din Salah (1910–1957), Egyptian diplomat
- Luay Salah (born 1982), Iraqi footballer
- Maha Naji Salah, Yemeni writer and social activist
- Mohamed Salah (born 1992), Egyptian footballer
- Mohamed Salah (footballer, born 1956) (born 1956), Egyptian football manager and player
- Raed Salah (born 1958), Palestinian religious leader
- Trish Salah, Lebanese-Canadian feminist writer, educator, and sociologist
- Yassine Salah (born 1998), Moroccan footballer
- Yiḥyah Salaḥ (1713–1805), Yemeni rabbi, author, and scholar

== See also ==
- Beni Salah (disambiguation)
- Salah (disambiguation)
- Salah ad-Din (name)
- Saleh (name)
