= Constantine Plan =

French-French Algerian economic development program

The Constantine Plan (French: Plan de Constantine) was an economic development program aiming to lessen the socio-economic gap between citizens of French Algeria and Metropolitan France. Financed by French capital, it was introduced in 1958 by President Charles de Gaulle during the height of the Algerian War in an attempt to quell uprisings of Algerian independence. The plan was structured based on the former Maspétiol Report, and the report entitled “Les perspectives décennales du développement économique de l'Algérie”, and officially commenced on October 3, 1958 after de Gaulle gave his speech in the Algerian city of Constantine.

The long-term impact and progress made by the Constantine Plan ran through many spheres of Algerian society including education, public service and administration, housing, and land distribution in French Algeria. The plan was intended to serve two purposes: to weaken support for the Front de libération nationale (FLN) in Algeria and to prevent the spread of communism, keeping Algeria in the Eurafrica sphere. In the long run, the plan proved to be unsuccessful in most of its goals as its promises were either not kept or were poorly implemented. The Constantine Plan failed to quell the Algerian War (1954–1962), which led to Algeria's independence in July 1962.

== Origins ==
Much of the planning and legislature surrounding the Constantine Plan was developed from a compilation of earlier reports which had aimed to establish Algeria's overall situation.

=== Maspétiol Report ===
Rapport général [dit Rapport Maspétiol], or the Maspétiol Report, also referred to as The Maspétiol Commission (1955) was a report that calculated the amount of French investment necessary in order to develop Algeria's economy. By taking into consideration colonies or countries whose size and developmental levels were similar to Algeria's, the report provided a quantitative and statistical basis for development. Roland Maspétio, who headed the study, stated that the French economy was fully capable of funding Algerian development, citing Les Trente Glorieuses, the period between 1945 and 1975 wherein France saw great economic development.

=== Les perspectives décennales du développement économique de l'Algérie ===
“Les perspectives décennales du développement économique de l'Algérie”, or “The 10 year perspectives of the economic development of Algeria” followed the Maspétiol Report in 1957. It was drafted by a group of young civil servants formed by the Algerian General Government. The report mapped out Algeria's economic prospects for the period spanning 1957-1966. The report also analyzed Algeria's current economic conditions in order to explain hurdles — such as Algeria's rapidly growing population — which the country would face in the coming years. It would be presented to French authorities in 1957, and would ultimately contribute heavily to the contents of Charles de Gaulle's speech in 1958.

=== Charles de Gaulle’s speech ===
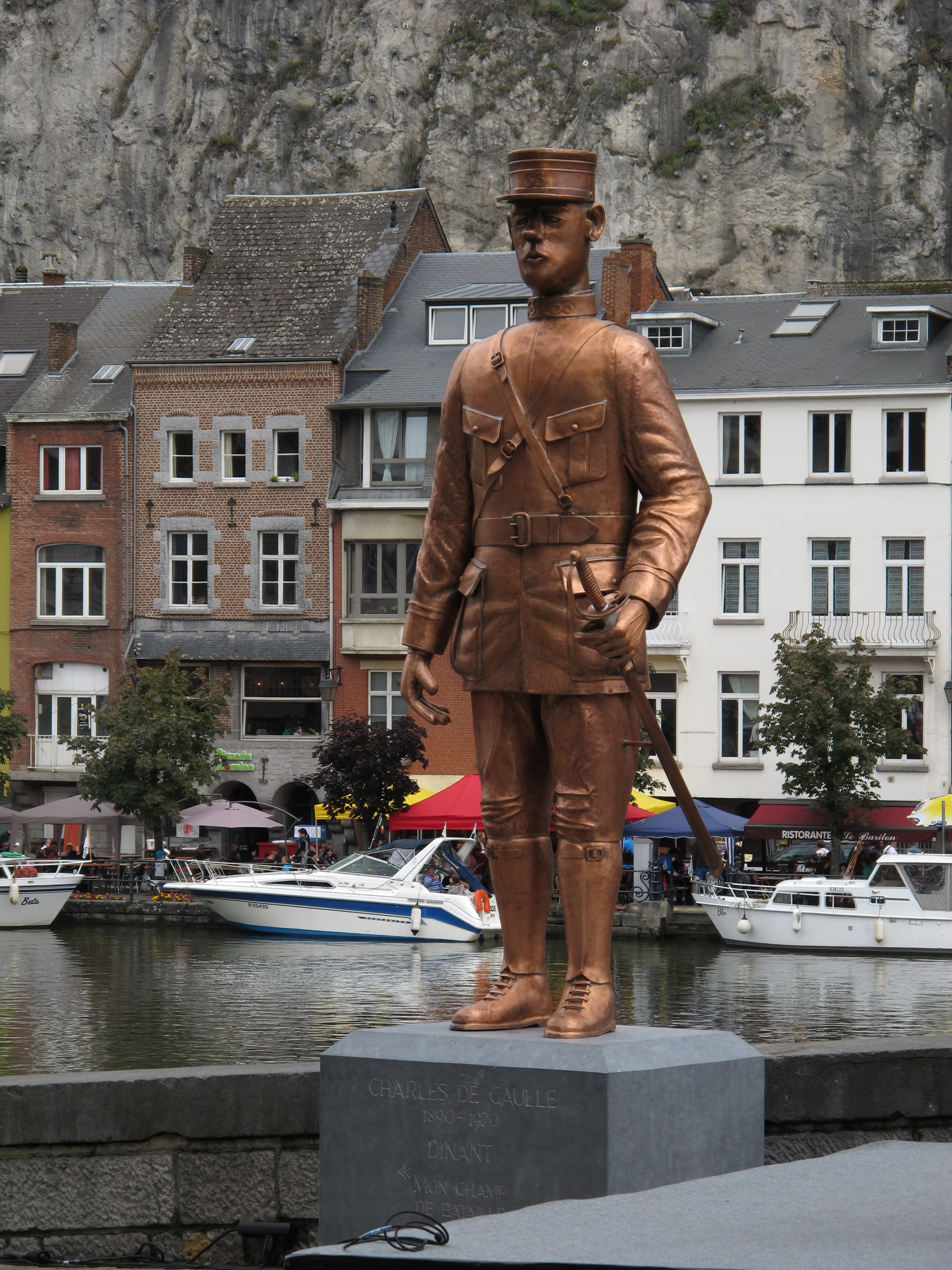
A Statue of Charles de Gaulle in Dinant

On October 3, 1958, French president Charles de Gaulle appeared before the people of Algeria, in the city of Constantine, and unveiled plans for a new development project to be financed by Metropolitan France. De Gaulle reaffirmed France's determination for renovation and his commitment towards developing French Algeria. He made bold promises for sweeping changes meant to improve every factor of Algeria's social, cultural, and economic system. He asserted that it was only through this transformation that Algeria would prosper, further elaborating that peace would be achieved, but only France was willing and able to provide the necessary aid to help Algeria accomplish these goals. De Gaulle denounced “extremism”, stating that turning towards extremist groups for guidance is a foolish endeavor that will only lead to destruction and that these groups that incite unrest and wage war on France are not capable of providing Algeria with the same means that France is offering to give them. The speech noted a dichotomy of choice between either war or brotherhood. De Gaulle made it clear that of the two he preferred brotherhood, but only under French terms. Historical experts have identified the speech as being perceived by De Gaulle as an opportunity to undermine the growing unrest and support for the Front de libération nationale (FLN), or the National Liberation Front in Algeria. This claim is based on the fact that the speech came during the peak of the Algerian War as France and the FLN were locked in a heated battle for Algerian independence. The Constantine Plan also served as an attempt to keep Algeria squarely in the Eurafrican zone. By taking hold of the country's economic development, France hoped to be able to prevent the spread of communism.

== Conditions in Algeria prior to the Constantine Plan ==
=== French colonialism in Algeria ===
==== Education ====
Prior to France's conquest of Algeria in 1830, the Algerian educational system only provided schooling until the secondary level. Education was also not state run, and instead, was funded by wealthy religious donors. Primary and middle school education focused on teaching reading and writing in Arabic as well as memorization of Qur’anic verses. Secondary education taught theology, jurisprudence, and law, and took place in mosques or independent quarters known as madaris. French officials initially promised that they would continue to allow the operation of Qur’anic schools. In practice, new French legislation undermined the pre-existing system to spread French culture. Over time, many of these schools were forced to shut down due to lack of funding. French officials created state-run publicly funded schools that competed with traditional Qur’anic schools. Consequently, the French administration's influence on Algeria's educational system steadily grew. Moreover, the roles of colonial officials were expanded, the instruction of French was added to all curriculums, and more focus was placed on non-religious programs such as arithmetic, history, and geography. However, as free modern Arabic schools that did not teach French had developed throughout the 1930s, French officials refused to shut down Arabic Ulama schools due to the fact that French public schools were beginning to lack the capacity to take in more students by the 1950s. Constructing enough schools and training enough teachers to cope with approximately two million 5 to 15 year old Algerians was a colossal task and financial burden for French administrators.

Because of the French government's refusal to close Ulama schools, the Arabic schools provided education to those the French could not. The increasing demands for education later informed decisions regarding Algerian education in the development of the Constantine Plan.

==== Public service and administration ====
A result of France's steadily growing influence on the Algerian education system was the gradual replacement of various institutional leaders. After the French government installed state run madaris, they stipulated that any man charged with teaching at a level leading directly to higher education had to be educated at one of France's state run schools. Approved representatives at all levels of administration— from school officials to Muslim preachers — were installed to influence Algerian culture from the ground up. This policy was applied to such an extent that an Algerian minister commented prior to the implementation of the Constantine Plan, that of the 864 administrative high posts, 8 were Muslim held.

== Goals ==
The Constantine Plan was an ambitious project that aimed to increase wages, housing, and public infrastructure across colonial French Algeria. It was an overarching program meant to target all levels of Algeria's society. The plan focused on modernizing Algeria in order to mitigate the socio-economic discrepancy that had existed both statistically and in the eyes of the colonial French government between the Algerian people and Europeans. The plan would ultimately be the result of several years of work completed by economists, academics, and statisticians.

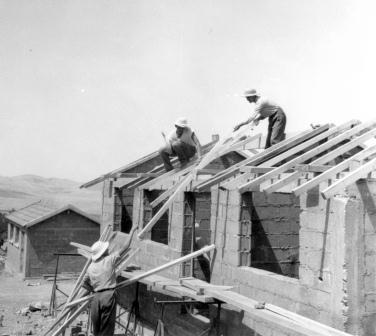
Workers in Algeria constructing a house, 1956

It promised comprehensive improvements including, but not limited to:

1. Raising national revenue by 7.5%
2. Increasing the number of children able to access education to 1.5 million
3. The creation of large-scale industry, especially metallurgical and chemical industries through the use of oil and gas from the Sahara
4. Creation of housing for a million people
5. Increasing of employment levels through the creation of 400,000 new Algerian-based jobs, and an additional 100,000 France-based jobs for Algerians.
6. Redistribution of 250,000 hectares of land.
7. Promising that at least 10% of France's judiciary, administrative, and education roles would be set aside for Arab Algerians.

The implementation of the plan necessitated the creation of le Conseil supérieur du plan, or the Constantine Plan Superior Council. With 43 members, the original council was led by three individuals. The First was Pierre Massé, a top French government official who served as both the Commissioner General regarding equipment and modernization and the council chair. Alongside Pierre Masse were Salah Bouakouir, the Secretary of both economic affairs and the general delegation, and Jean Vibert, the general director of the Constantine Plan and of economic research.

In the project's planned 5-year run, France promised to commit 350 million francs towards agriculture, forestry and hydraulics and another 460 million francs towards the development of industry and energy.

== Results ==
=== Industry and employment ===
Estimations state that 80,000 new jobs had to be created every year in order to keep up with the exponential growth of Muslim workers entering the Algerian economy. Despite this fact, only 400 new factories were either built or planned to be built in the two years following the implementation of the Constantine Plan. These 400 factories would have only provided 28,000 of the needed 80,000 jobs, and even then these numbers were over inflated and the true number was believed to be only half of the estimated 28,000. Following years did not see an increase in the rate of job growth, and the planned 400,000 new jobs would not have been possible in the 5-year span first set about by the Constantine Plan. In promising the creation of these 400,000 new jobs, the industries in which these jobs would be created had not yet been determined. The agriculture industry was already oversaturated (about 65% of the male working population), and the service industry was also considerably developed due to the war (about 20% of the male working population). Most of the jobs would eventually be created in heavy industry (mining, energy, construction) fuelled largely by the public infrastructure works financed by the plan itself, as well as hydrocarbon research and extraction given the plan to utilize gas and oil reserves in the Sahara. Ultimately, the plan would create 106,810 new jobs — approximately 25% of its originally promised numbers.

=== Education ===
After the plan's first year of implementation, the enrollment rate of Muslim children in schools doubled; however, over half of the country's school-age children continued to lack access to any kind of formal education. The schools were heavily dependent on French capital and teachers, and were ultimately criticized for being unsustainable. Additionally, with funding being concentrated in urban centres, the accessibility issue intensified in rural regions.

=== Public service and administration ===
Following the implementation of the Constantine Plan and General de Gaulle's promise to open up new administrative posts for Arab Algerians, Muslim participation in administration increased from 21,000 to 37,000. Muslim involvement in military ranks also saw exponential growth as more and more posts became open to the greater Muslim population.

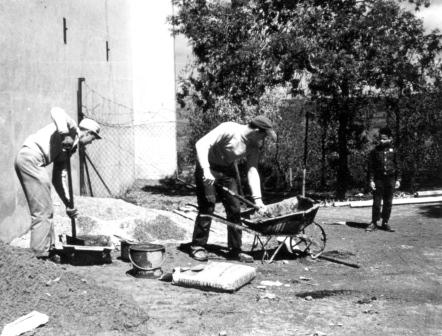
House construction in Constantine, Algeria, 1961

=== Housing ===
De Gaulle's promise to create more housing culminated in the creation of both Le campagne de mille villages and Les villages de regroupement. While Le campagne de mille villages served its purpose of housing 1 million Algerian people, Les villages de regroupement brought together 2 million, many of whom were forcefully removed from their villages, and subjected to abject poverty.

=== Land distribution ===
The redistribution of land ended in failure. Originally promising to redistribute 250,000 hectares amongst 15,000 families, the plan managed to redistribute less than 20% of their promised goal. By 1961 only 41,000 hectares had been distributed to 1800 families. The plan ultimately failed to address chronic land shortage, a pressing problem of economic survival in the Algerian countryside given that 6.5-million Algerians at the time still depended on an agricultural sector in which about 22,000 settler-owned farms produced a volume of saleable produce equivalent to that of approximately 600,000 Algerian-owned smallholdings.

== Legacy ==
If the purpose of the Constantine Plan was to reduce popular support for the FLN, then the shortcomings of the Constantine plan doomed the public relations aspect to failure. The launching of the Constantine Plan is viewed by scholars as largely an attempt to further integrate Algeria into France's sphere of influence, particularly in an economic sense. Since many of the bodies created by the plan continued to operate after 1962, the plan cannot be solely identified as a colonial phenomenon or an effort to subjugate Algeria.

=== Criticisms ===
Historian Martin Thomas adopted a critical outlook on the plan. Although the plan was meant to be a transformative development scheme, Thomas believed that the execution of the Constantine Plan was doomed to fail due to sheer financial issues arising from France ramping up costly military operations such as its nuclear program. In regard to domestic reaction, Algerian socialists believed the plan was proof that de Gaulle shared similar values referring to public infrastructure projects, state-funded employment, and public housing. Others believed the plan as a whole to be a misguided economic solution to a program that was primarily political. Dorothy Pickles, in her book Algeria and France From Colonialism to Cooperation, argues that even if the Constantine Plan had accomplished all that it had set out to do it still would not have been enough to meet all of Algeria's growing needs and fully develop it to a level equal to Europe, as Charles de Gaulle claimed. For Pickles, the goals set about by the plan would have no doubt eased France's plan for the creation of a new French Algeria, “but they [were] only the beginning of the beginning”.
