= Saleh (name) =

Saleh or Saaleh (Arabic: صَالَح ), Arabic form of the Hebrew Shelah, Selah or Methuselah (Hebrew: שֶׁלַח), is a Semitic male name derivative. In Arabic it means "righteous" or "pious". Notable people with the name include:

== Given name ==
=== Saleh ===
- Saleh or Salih, Islamic prophet
- Saleh al-Arouri (1966–2024), senior leader of Hamas
- Saleh Bakri (born 1977), Palestinian film and theater actor
- Saleh Abdelaziz Al-Haddad (born 1986), Kuwaiti long jumper
- Saleh al-Jafarawi (1997–2025), Palestinian journalist and social media influencer
- Salleh Kalbi (1964–2025), Malaysian politician
- Saleh and Daoud Al-Kuwaity (1908–1986), Iraqi-Jewish musicians
- Saleh al-Luhaydan (1932–2022), Saudi cleric
- Saleh Mohammadi (2007–2026), Iranian wrongfully executed wrestler
- Saleh al-Mutlaq (born 1947), Iraqi politician
- Saleh Abdul Aziz Al Rajhi (1921–2011), Saudi Arabian businessman
- Saleh Shahin (born 1982), Israeli Paralympic medalist rower
- Saleh bin Abdul-Aziz Al ash-Sheikh (born 1959), Saudi cleric
- Saleh al-Uthaymin (1929–2001), Saudi cleric

=== Salih ===
- Salih, 14th century leader of Adal
- Salih Ibn Ashyam Al-Adawi (died 695), Muslim tabi'i of Basra
- Salih Saif Aldin (1975–2007), Iraqi journalist
- Salih al-Ali (1883–1950), Syrian Alawite military commander
- Salih ibn Ali (711–769), the Abbasid general and governor in Syria and Egypt
- Salih Altın (born 1987), German football player
- Salih Altoma (born 1929), Iraqi poet, author, and professor emeritus of near eastern languages and cultures
- Salih Mahdi Ammash (1924–1985), Iraqi historian, writer, author, poet, and politician
- Salih Ashmawi (1910–1983), Egyptian politician
- Salih Aydın (born 1997), Turkish Greco-Roman wrestler
- Salih Saeed Ba-Amer (1946–2025), Yemeni short story writer
- Salih Bademci (born 1984), Turkish actor
- Salih Bajrami (1919–1987), Kosovar singer
- Salih Basheer (born 1995), Sudanese photographer
- Salih Zaki Bey (1900–1969), Iraqi Politician
- Salih Bora (born 1953), Turkish footballer
- Salih Bozok (1881–1941), Turkish military officer
- Salih Çetinkaya (born 1972), Turkish politician
- Salih Zeki Çolak (born 1954), Turkish Army general
- Salih Delalić (1948–2002), Bosnian footballer
- Salih Durkalić (born 1951), Croatian footballer
- Salih Dursun (born 1991), Turkish footballer
- Salih Efendi (1827–1895), Albanian Islamic religious leader
- Salih Faraj (1926–??), Iraqi basketball player
- Salih al‑Fawzan (born 1935), Saudi cleric
- Salih Fazlić (born 1975), Bosnian volleyball player
- Salih Fırat (born 1960), Turkish politician
- Salih Gjuka (1876–1925), Albanian teacher and activist
- Salih Güney (born 1945), Turkish film actor
- Salih bin Muhsin Al-Hamid (1895–1976), Hadhrami Sufi scholar and a Wali
- Salih al-Hasnawi (born 1960), Iraqi psychiatrist, professor, public health expert, and politician
- Salih Hassan (born 1962), British rower
- Salih al-Hassani, Iraqi politician
- Salih Hudayar (born 1993), Uyghur prime-minister of government
- Salih bin Abdullah al-Humaid (born 1949), Saudi Islamic scholar and judge
- Salih Jaber (born 1985), Iraqi footballer
- Salih Jabr (1896–1957), Iraqi statesman
- Salih al-Ja'fari (1910–1979), Egyptian Sufi scholar
- Salih al-Karzakani, Bahraini theologian
- Salih Koç (1917–2000), Turkish equestrian
- Salih Korkmaz (born 1997), Turkish racewalking athlete
- Salih Kuru (1906–2012), Turkish war veteran
- Salih Kuyas, Turkish philatelist
- Salih Malkoçoğlu (born 2005), Turkish footballer
- Salih I ibn Mansur, Arab monarch, founder of the Kingdom of Nekor
- Salih Memecan (born 1952), Turkish editorial caricaturist and cartoonist
- Salih ibn Mirdas (died 1029), Arab royal, founder of the Mirdasid dynasty and emir of Aleppo
- Salih Mirzabeyoğlu (1950–2018), Turkish Islamist militant leader and religious fundamentalist
- Salih Rajab al-Mismari, Libyan politician and general
- Salih Muslim Muhammad (1951–2026), Rojava politician
- Salih Mustafa (born 1972), Kosovo Albanian war commander
- Salih Neftçi (1947–2009), Turkish financial economist
- Salih Nijazi (1876–1941), Albanian Dedebaba of the Bektashians
- Salih Omurtak (1889–1954), Turkish general
- Salih Mahmoud Osman (born 1957), Sudanese human rights lawyer
- Salih Özcan (born 1998), Turkish footballer
- Salih Pasha (disambiguation), various Ottoman people
- Salih Uglla Peshteri (1849–1945), Albanian performer of epic poetry
- Salih al-Souissi al-Qayrawani (1871–1941),
- Salih ibn Abd al-Rahman, Umayyad bureaucrat
- Salih Sadir (born 1981), Iraqi footballer
- Salih Šehović (1936–2022), Bosnian footballer
- Salih ibn Tarif, Moroccan religious leaders and monarch
- Salih Uçan (born 1994), Turkish footballer
- Salih Usar, Northern Cypriot politician
- Salih Uyar (born 1962), Turkish Guantanamo detainee
- Salih Uzun (born 1970), Turkish politician
- Salih Vuçitërni (1880–1949), Albanian political figure and royalist
- Salih J. Wakil (1927–2019), American biochemist
- Salih ibn Wasif (died 870), Turkic officer in the service of the Abbasid Caliphate
- Salih Yildiz (born 1978), Dutch footballer
- Salih Yıldız (born 2001), Turkish judoka
- Salih Yoluç (born 1985), Turkish racing driver
- Salih Zeki (1864–1921), Ottoman Turkish mathematician and astronomer

== Surname ==
=== Saleh ===
- Abdul Azis Saleh (1914–2001), Indonesian politician
- Abdul Rahman Saleh (1909–1947), Indonesian aviator and physician
- Adam Saleh (born 1993), American YouTube personality
- Ahmad Ali Abdullah Saleh (born 1972), Yemeni military commander
- Ali Abdullah Saleh (1947–2017), former President of Yemen
- Allah-Yar Saleh (1897–1981), Iranian politician
- Amrullah Saleh (born 1972), former vice president and 16th de jure president of Afghanistan
- Anas Khalid Al Saleh (born 1972), Kuwaiti politician
- Dua Saleh, Sudanese-American singer and actor
- Farhan Saleh (born 1947), Lebanese writer and militant
- Hashim Saleh (born 1981), Omani footballer
- Jahanshah Saleh (1905–1995), Iranian physician
- Nathanael Saleh (born 2006), British actor
- Nimr Saleh (1929–1991), Palestinian leftist figure
- Raden Saleh (1811–1880), Indonesian painter
- Robert Saleh (born 1979), American, NFL football coach
- Sania Saleh (1935–1985), Syrian poet
- Yehiya Saleh (1713–1805), Yemenite Rabbi

=== Salih ===
- Barham Salih (born 1960), Iraqi Kurdish politician and president of Iraq (2018–2022)
- Rizvie Salih, Sri Lankan physician and politician
- Tayeb Salih (1929–2009), Sudanese author

== Fictional characters ==
- Saleh, powerful and wise mage from Fire Emblem: Sacred Stones
- Salih Koçovalı, alternate name for Vartolu Sadettin in the Turkish television program Çukur
- Saleh, major antagonist in Tales of Rebirth
- Salleh, a minor character in the Malasyan cartoon Upin & Ipin
- Fatima Saleh, suspect in Criminal Minds
- Mr. Saleh, a teacher in Block 13

== See also ==
- Mada'in Saleh, an archaeological site in Saudi Arabia
- Methuselah
- Salah (name)
- Salehi
- Selah
- Shelah (name)
- Bahman Salehnia, an Iranian football coach
