= Hammamet, Tunisia =

Hammamet حمامات Ḥammāmāt
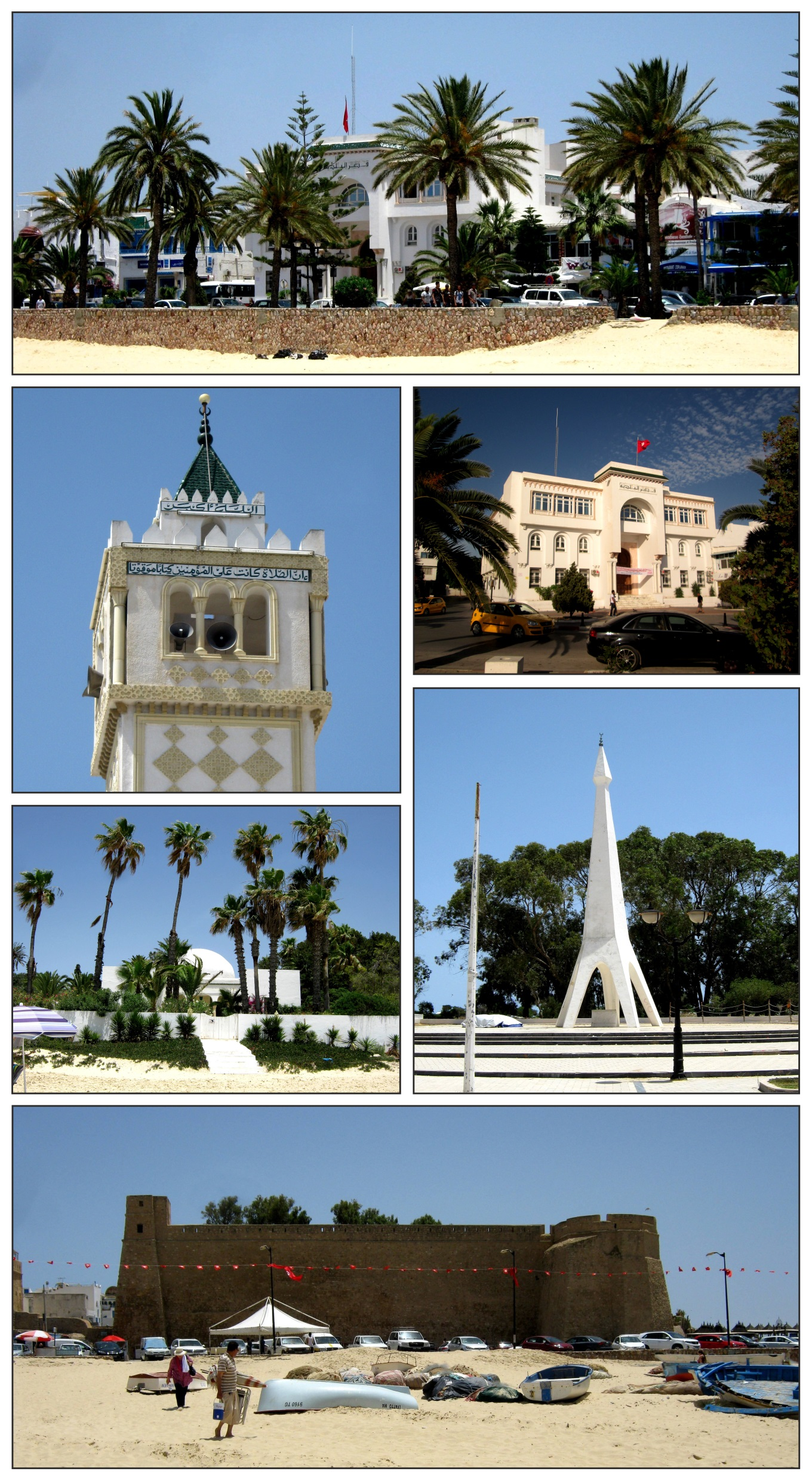

- Location in Tunisia
- Coordinates: 36°25′N 10°36′E
- Country: Tunisia
- Governorate: Nabeul Governorate

Government
  - Mayor: Moez Mrad (Independent)

Area
  - Total: 36 km^{2} (14 sq mi)

Population (2022)
  - Total: 106,326
  - Density: 3,000/km^{2} (7,600/sq mi)
- Time zone: UTC1 (CET)
- Website: Official website

Hammamet (Arabic: حمامات Ḥammāmāt, literally "Baths") is a town in the Nabeul Governorate of Tunisia. Due to its beaches, it is a popular destination for swimming and water sports and is one of the primary tourist destinations in Tunisia. It is located in the south-eastern section of Cape Bon.

The reported number of inhabitants varies from 100,000 to 400,000 and the population quadruples due to tourists' arrival in the summer.

It is particularly known for jasmine, which is the namesake of the tourist resort of Yasmine Hammamet. All over Hammamet, souvenirs crafted from jasmine can be found.

Around Hammamet, suburbs are being built as migrants from the southern region of the country come to find employment. As a popular tourist destination, the city is economically important to Tunisia.

The 2005 World Scout Conference was held in Hammamet.

== History ==
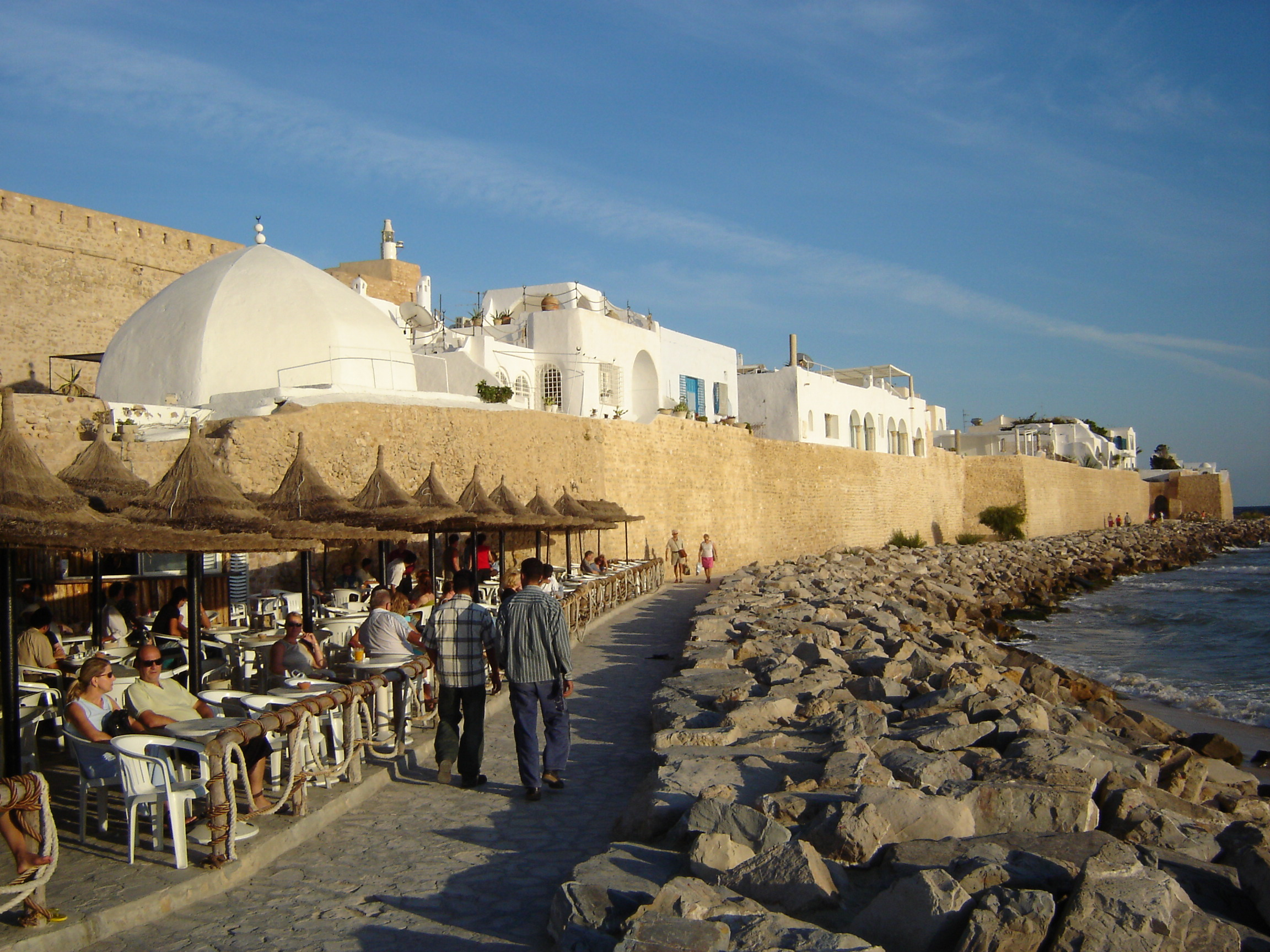
Hammamet Medina

In the 1st century, there was a settlement here known as Pupput. It was a town (now in the suburbs of Hammamet) that became a Roman colony in the 2nd century. In the 13th century, walls around town were built and medina of Hammamet was built in the 15th century. Then it came under Spanish and Turkish rule.

In 1601 it was the object of a successful Spanish attack. At that time the Spanish name for the place was "La Mahometa". Alonso de Contreras participated and tells the story in his autobiography. Three hundred men took seven hundred prisoners, mostly women, and children because most of the men in the town had fled, On 14 August 1605 there was another Spanish attack in which Contreras also participated but this time the result was disastrous for the attackers.

In World War II, it became one of the headquarters of the Nazi general Erwin Rommel. Festival international d'Hammamet was established in 1964.

Former Italian prime minister Bettino Craxi moved to Hammamet in 1994 as a fugitive. He died and was buried there in 2000.

== Geography ==
Hammamet is located in Nabeul Governorate in the east of Tunisia, it located to in the coast of Hammamet Golf. Hammamet is limited by Nabeul in northeast, Bou Argoub in North and Grombalia in northwest.

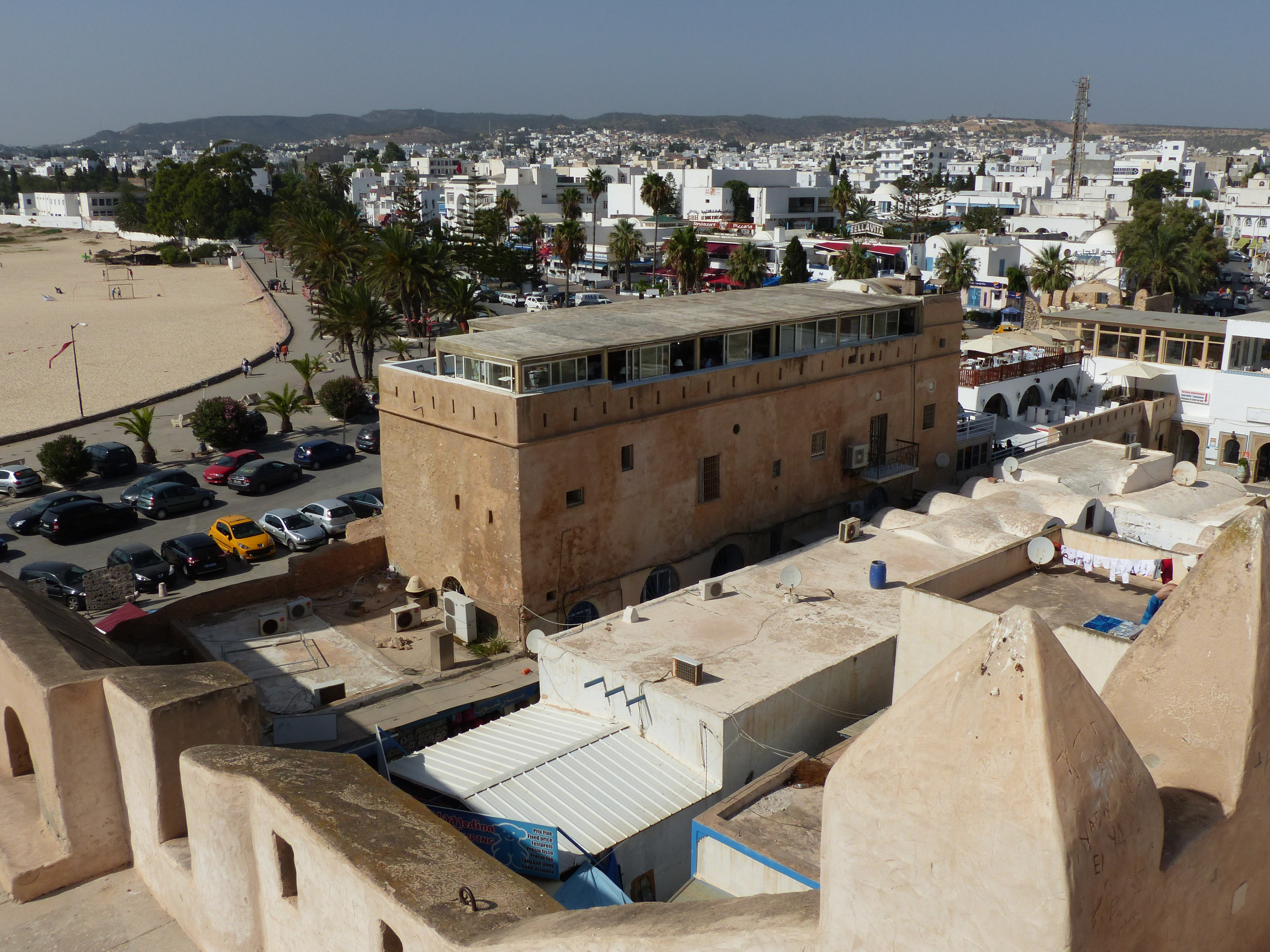
View of Hammamet Centre-Ville

== Transport ==
Hammamet is accessible via two nearby commercial airports : Tunis-Carthage Airport, located approximately 70 kilometers away, and Enfidha Airport, located 50 kilometers from the town. Regular coach services connect Hammamet to the central bus station in Tunis, while local taxicabs provide regional and intra-town transit.

== Tourism ==
Tourism represents a big sector of the city's economy. There are many touristic sites in Hammamet:

=== Yassmine Hammamet ===
Yassmine Hammamet is a seaside resort developed in the late 1990s. It's a touristic station modeled on Port El-Kantaoui located in the Gulf of Hammamet. It was Developed by the Société d'études et de développement d'Hammamet-Sud (SEDHS), and covers 277 hectares.

Yassmine Hammamet has 11 hotels of 5 stars, 25 hotels of 4 stars and 8 hotels of 3 stars.

A reproduction of an Arab medina called Medina Mediterranea, with its ramparts, souks, traditional housing, a theme park (Carthage Land) and a conference center have been set up. In addition, two casinos, seven thalassotherapy centers, a 1.5-kilometer long esplanade with its shopping malls, green spaces and entertainment centers complete the resort's layout.

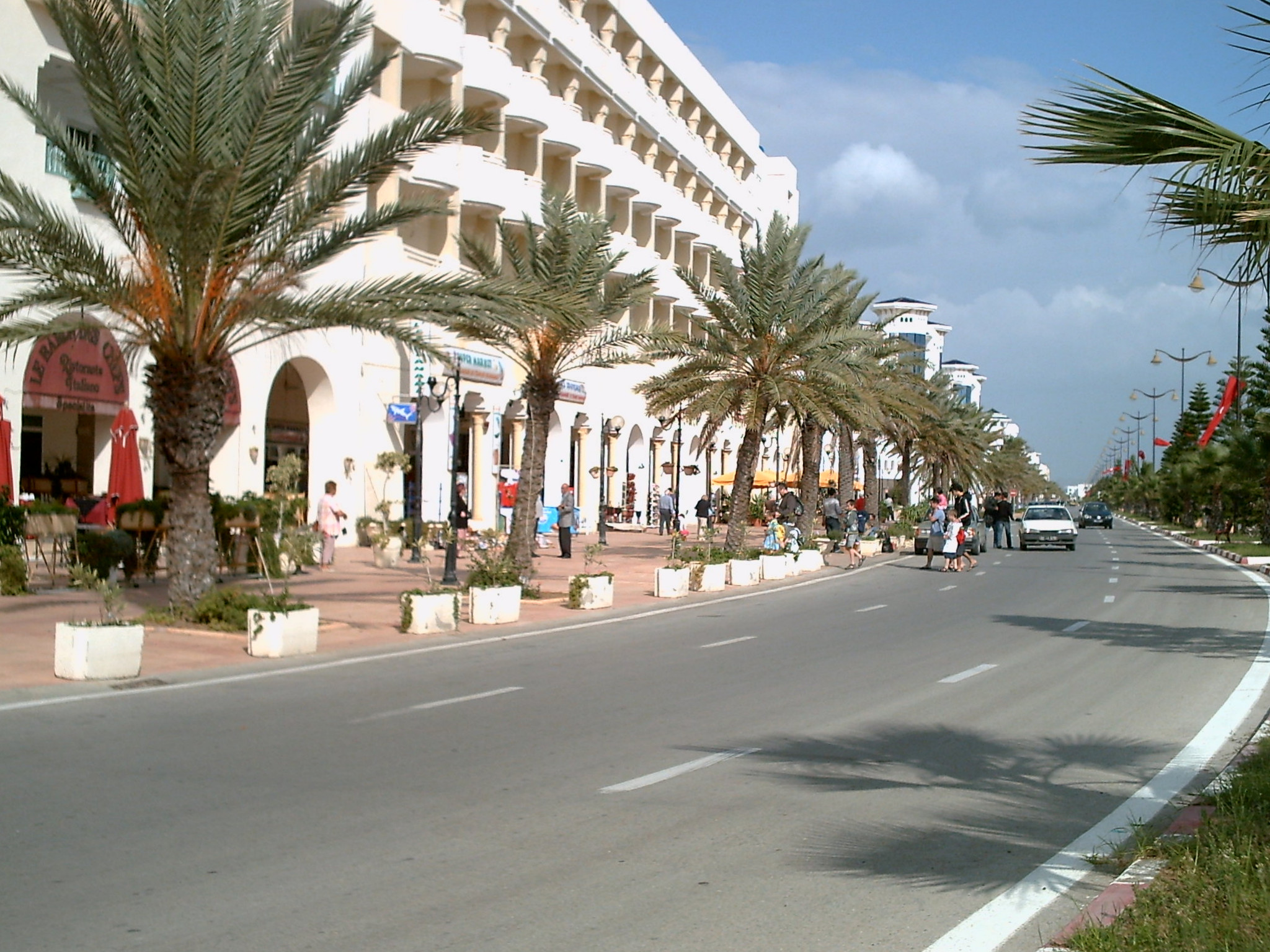

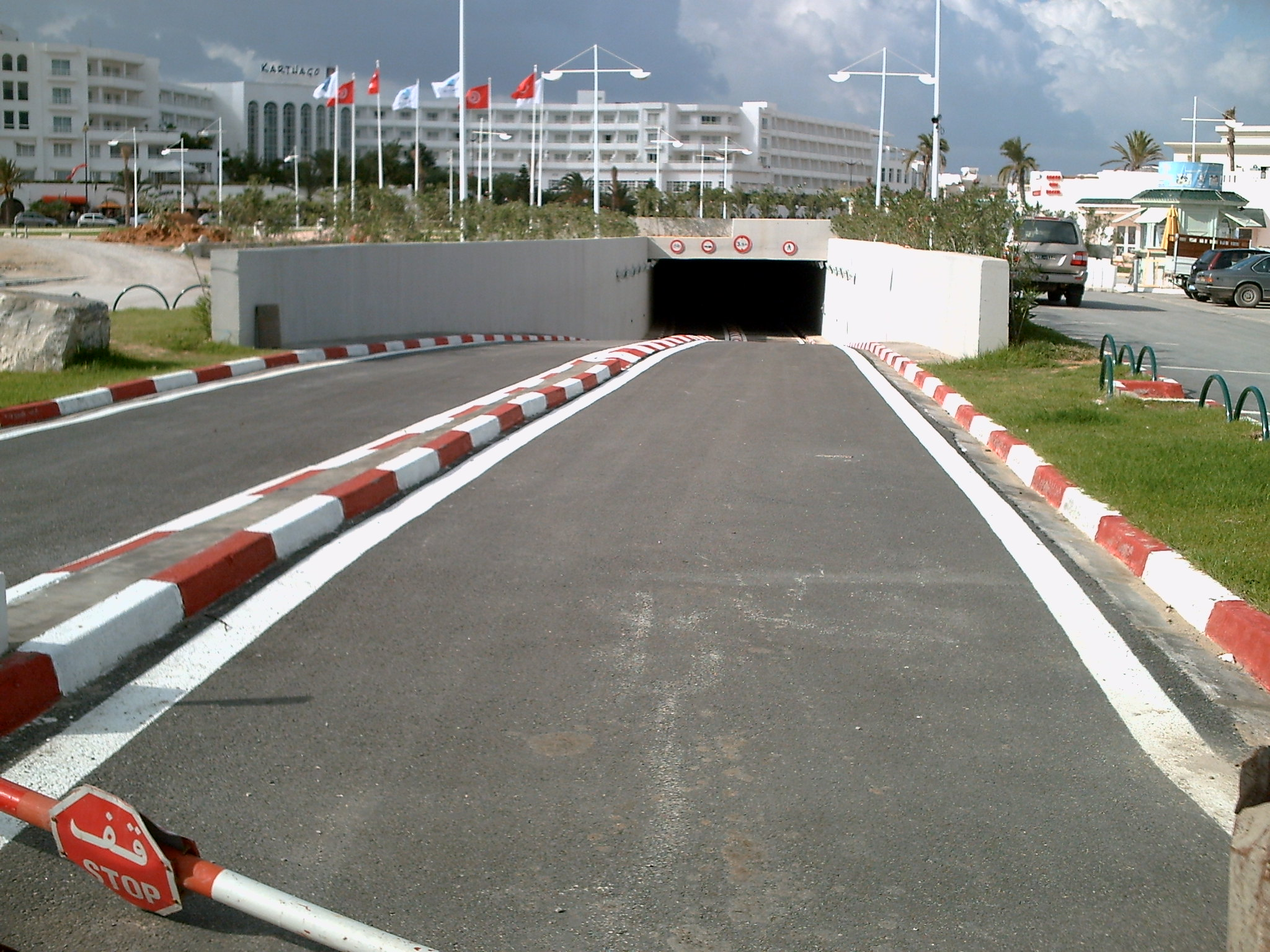

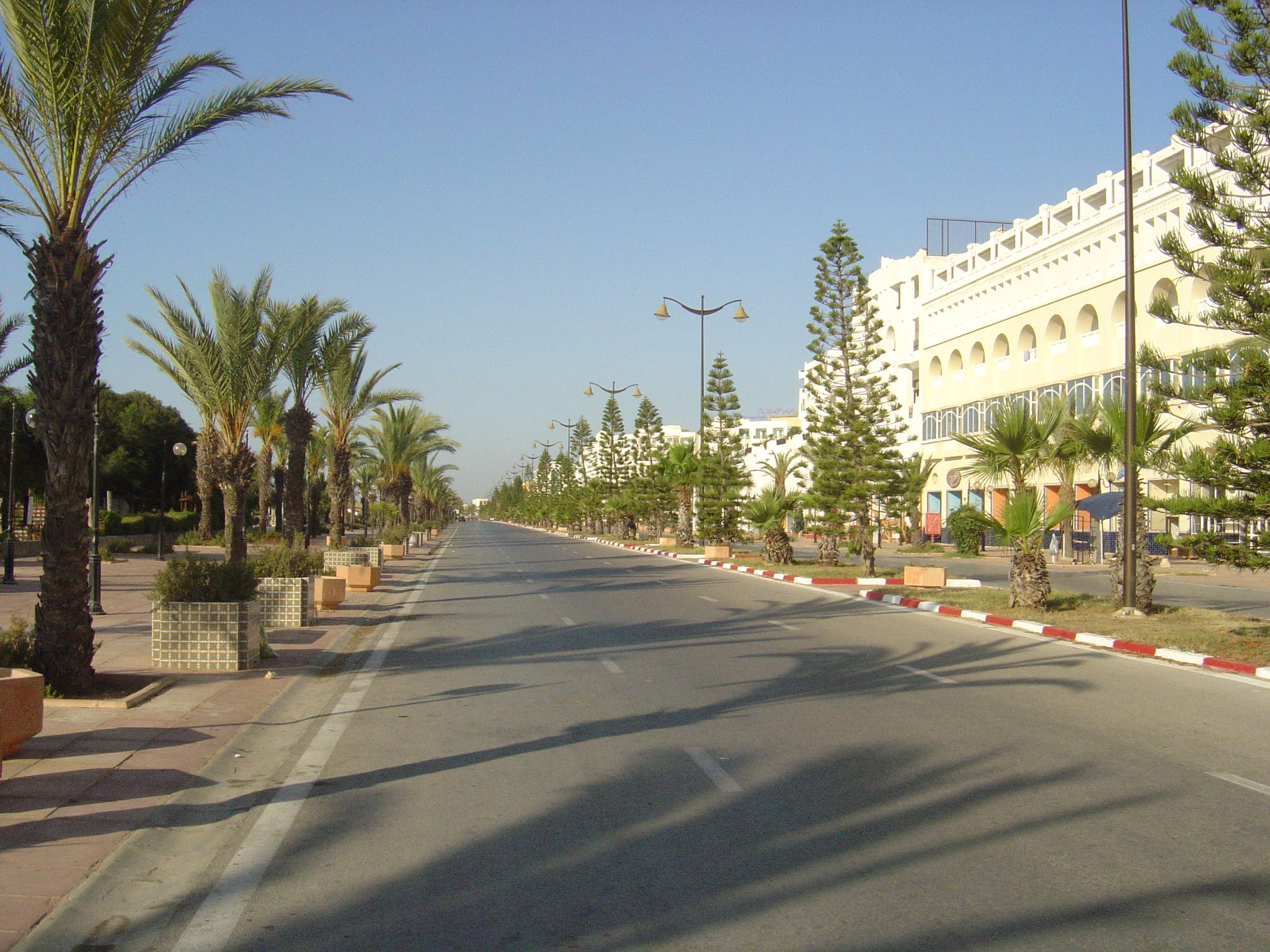

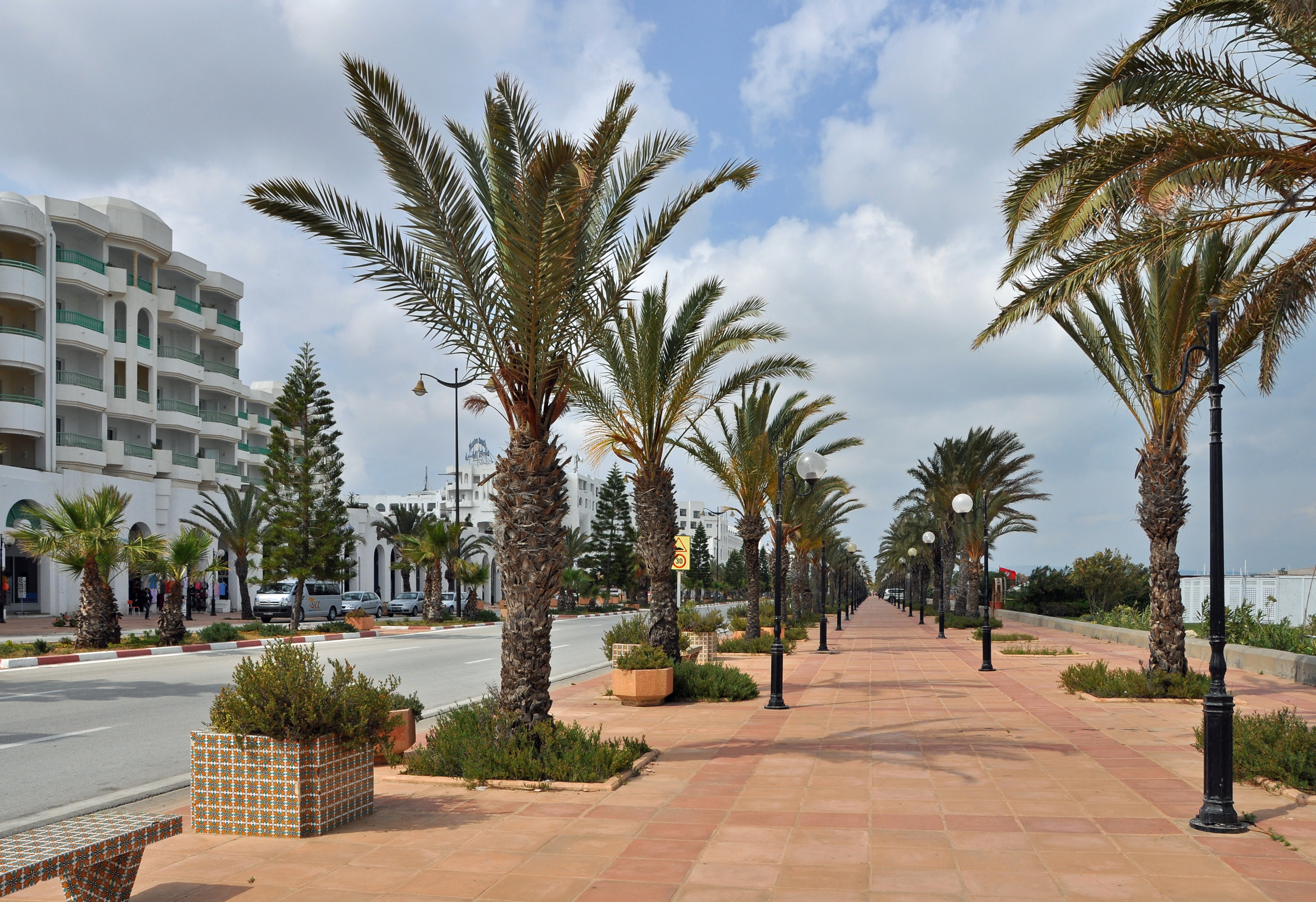

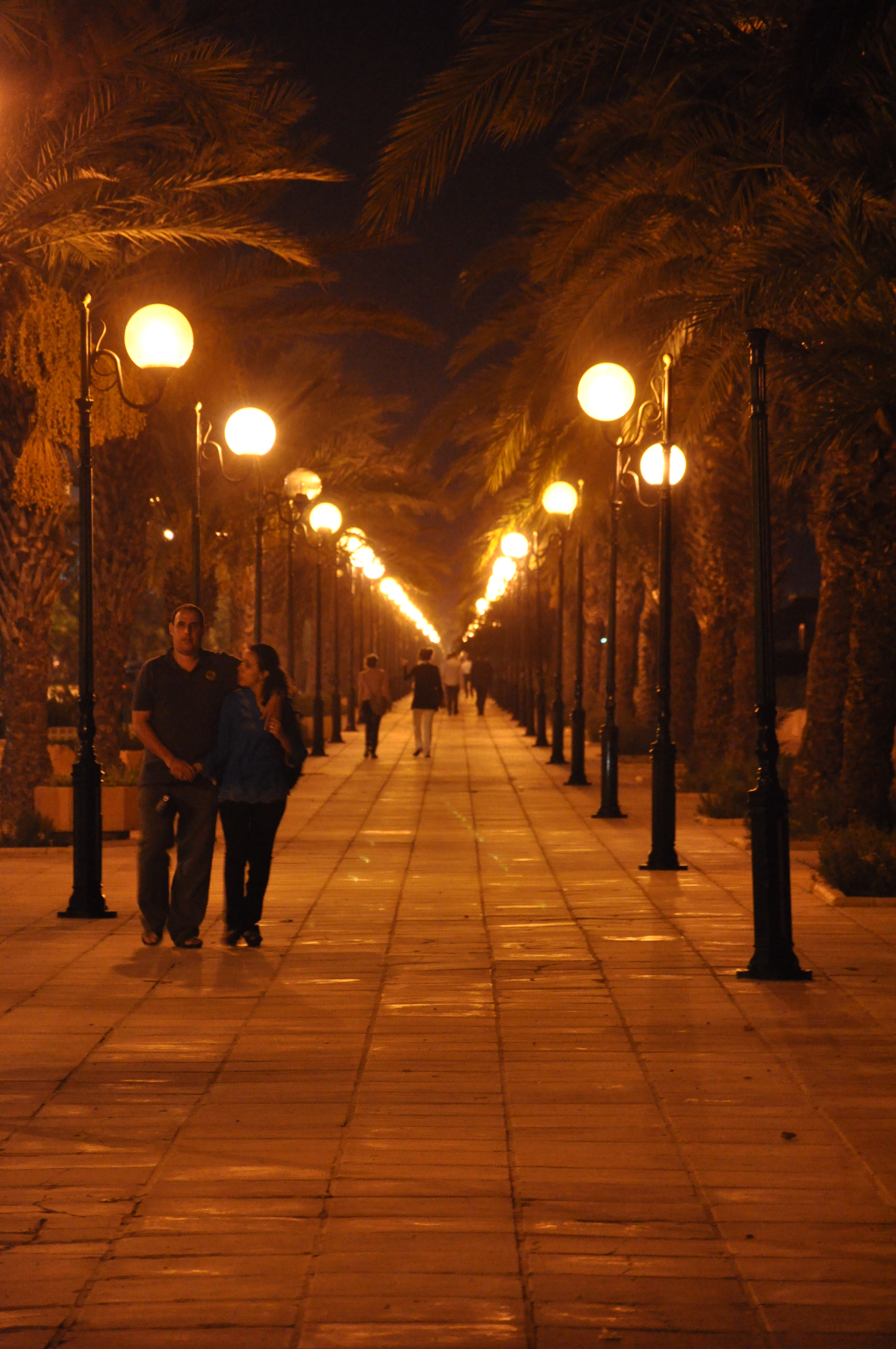

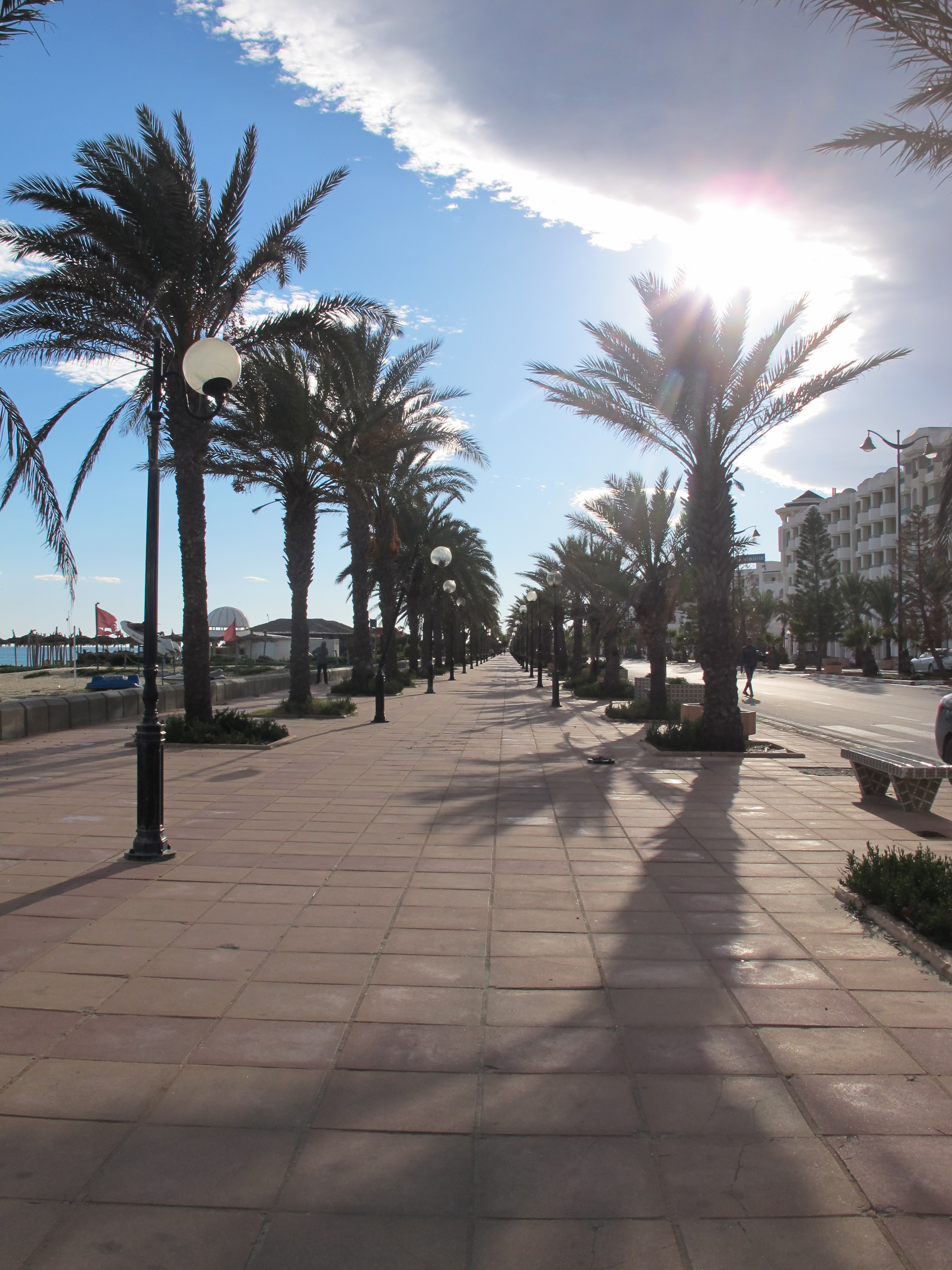

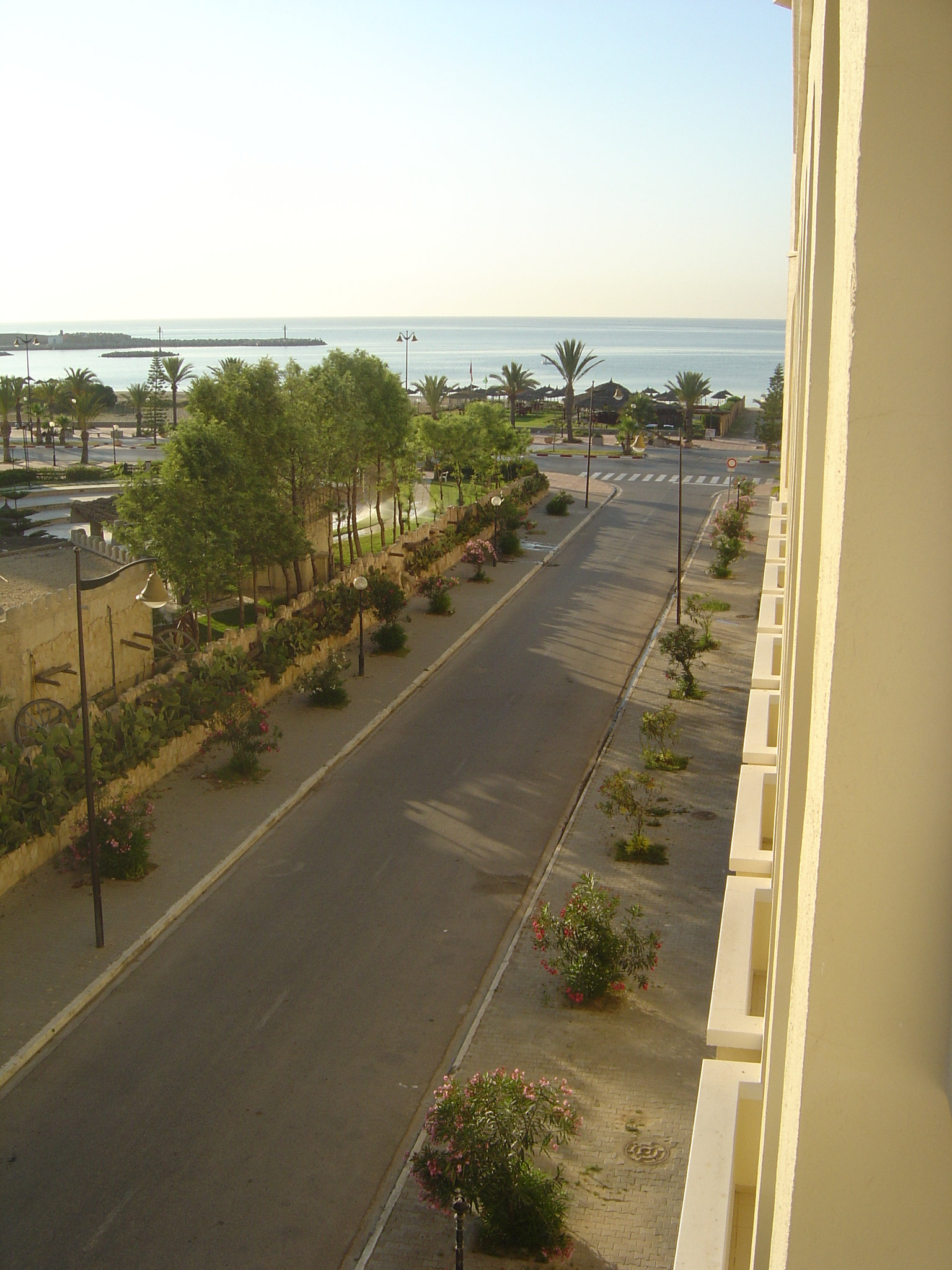

=== Others tourist resorts ===
Hammamet has others tourist resorts like Hammamet Nord, Hammamet Sud and the Medina.

== Festival ==
Hammamet is served by the Hammamet International Festival; a big Festival that takes place in summer.

== Gallery ==
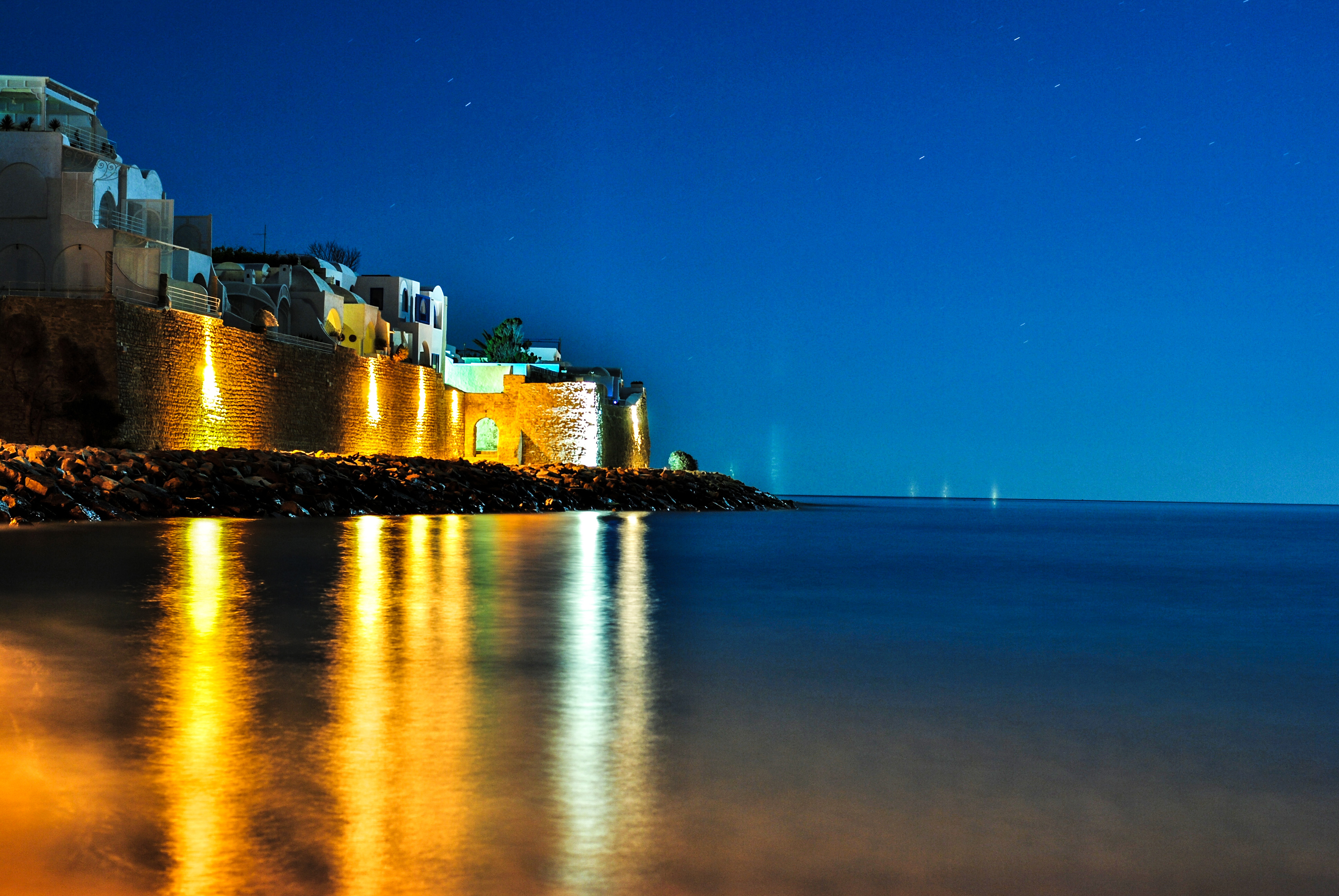

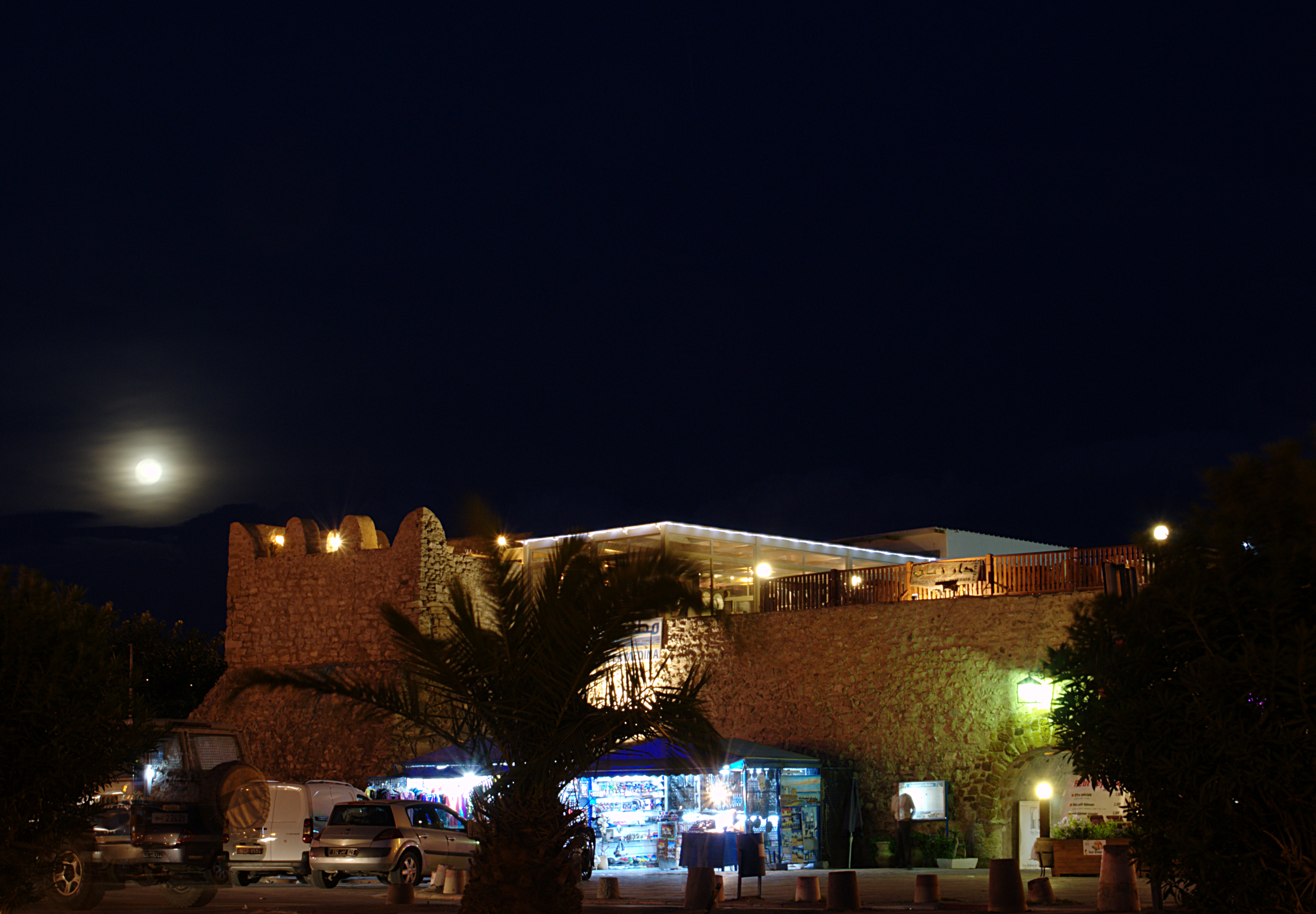

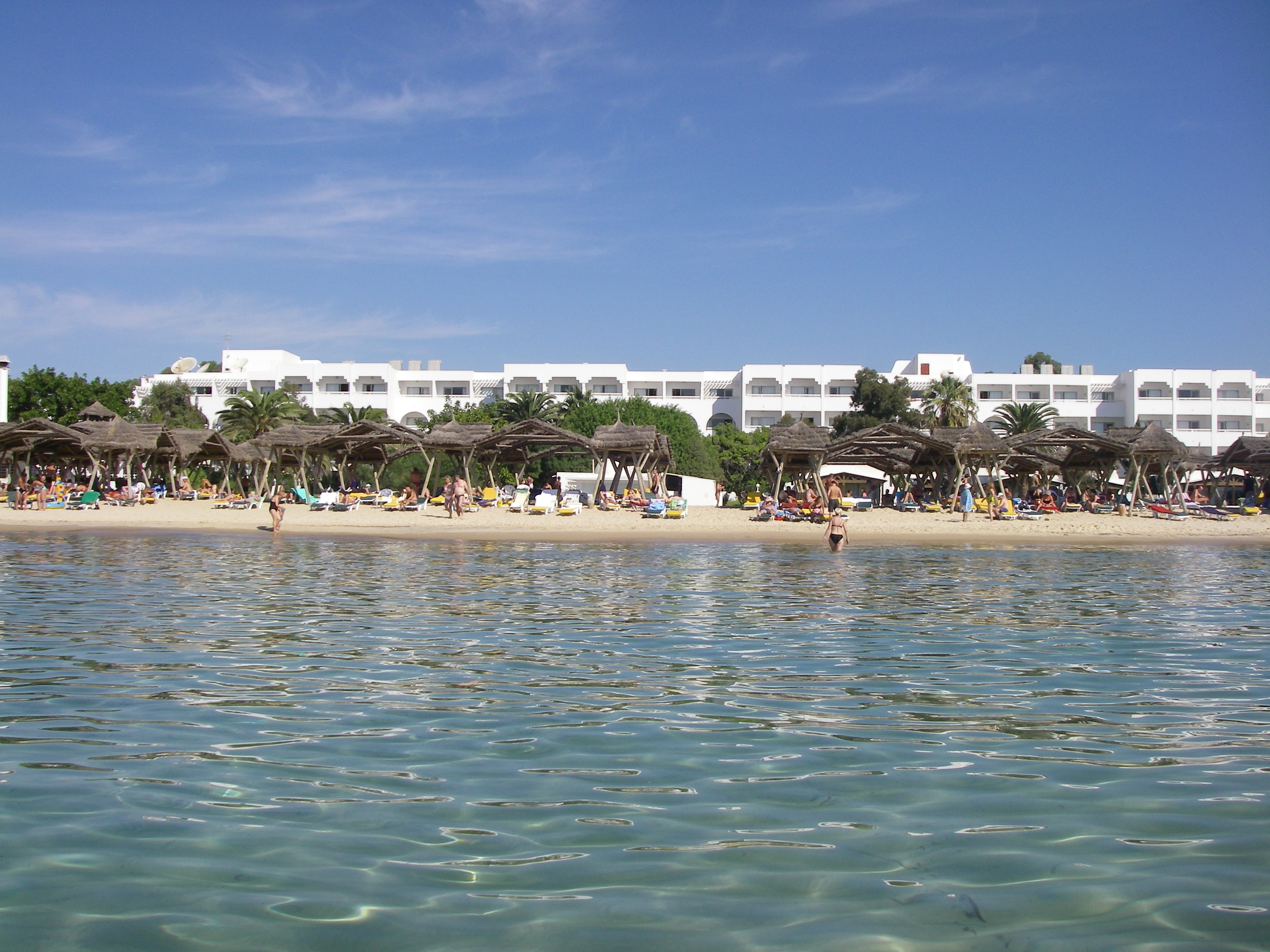

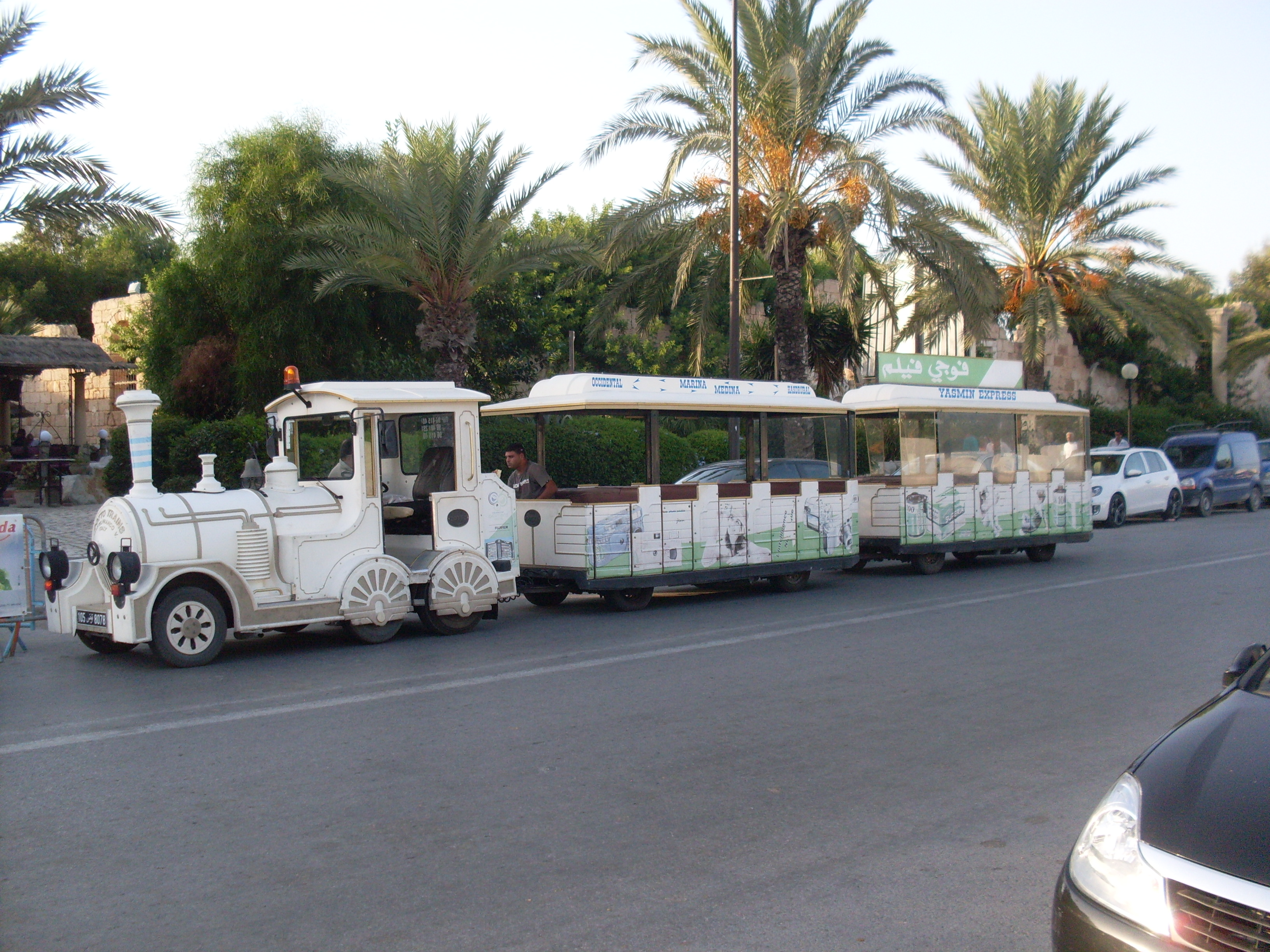

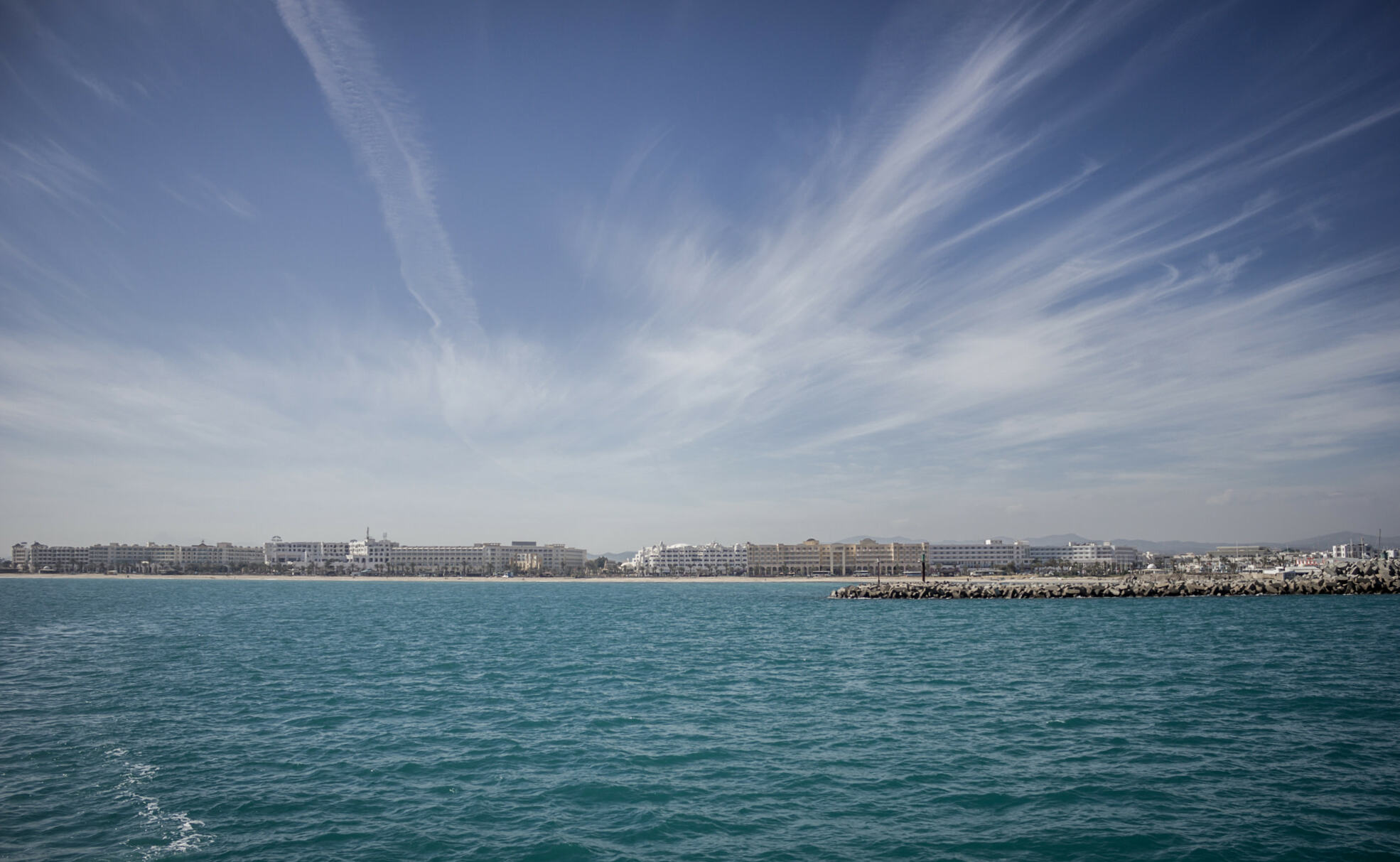

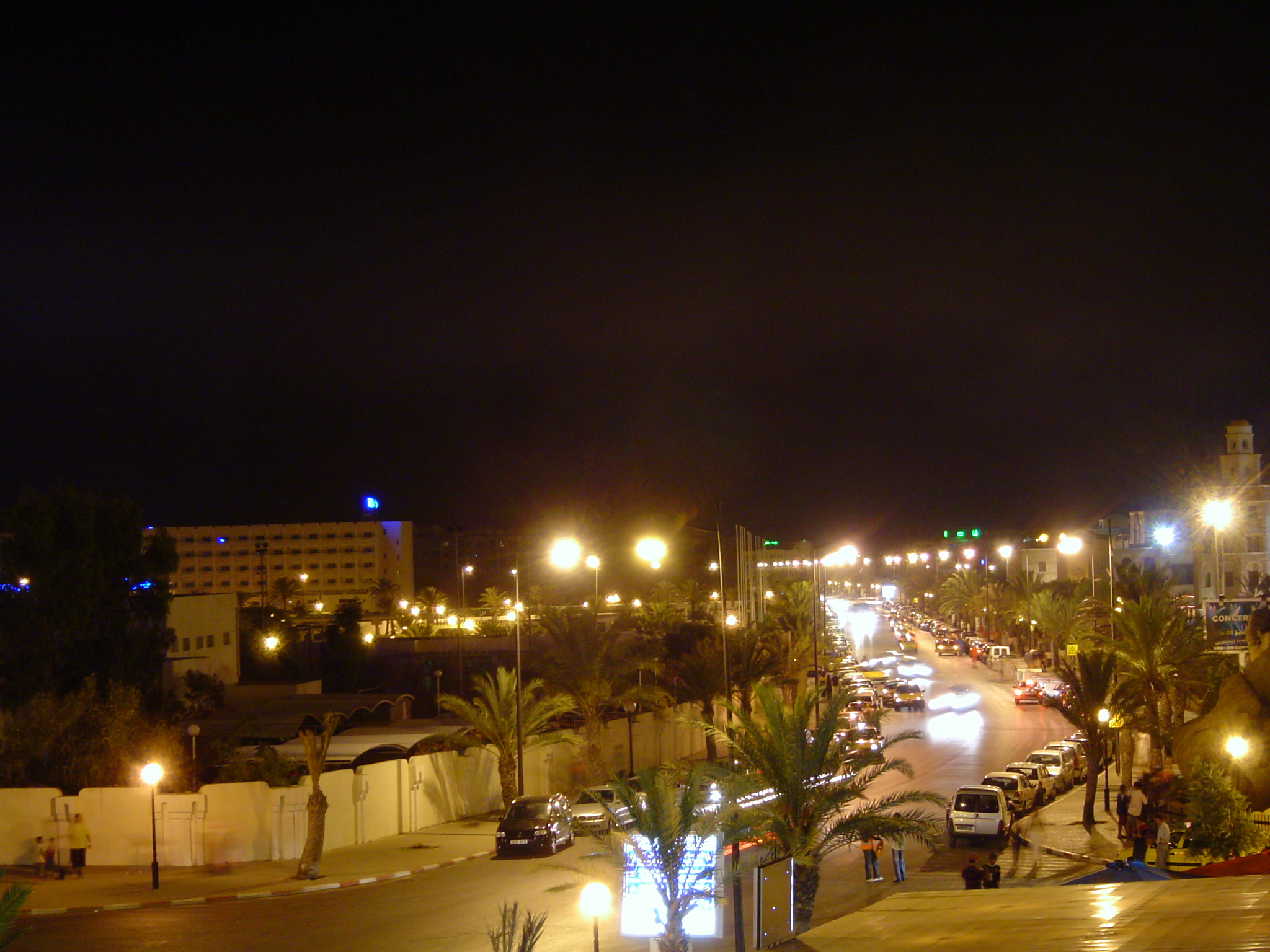

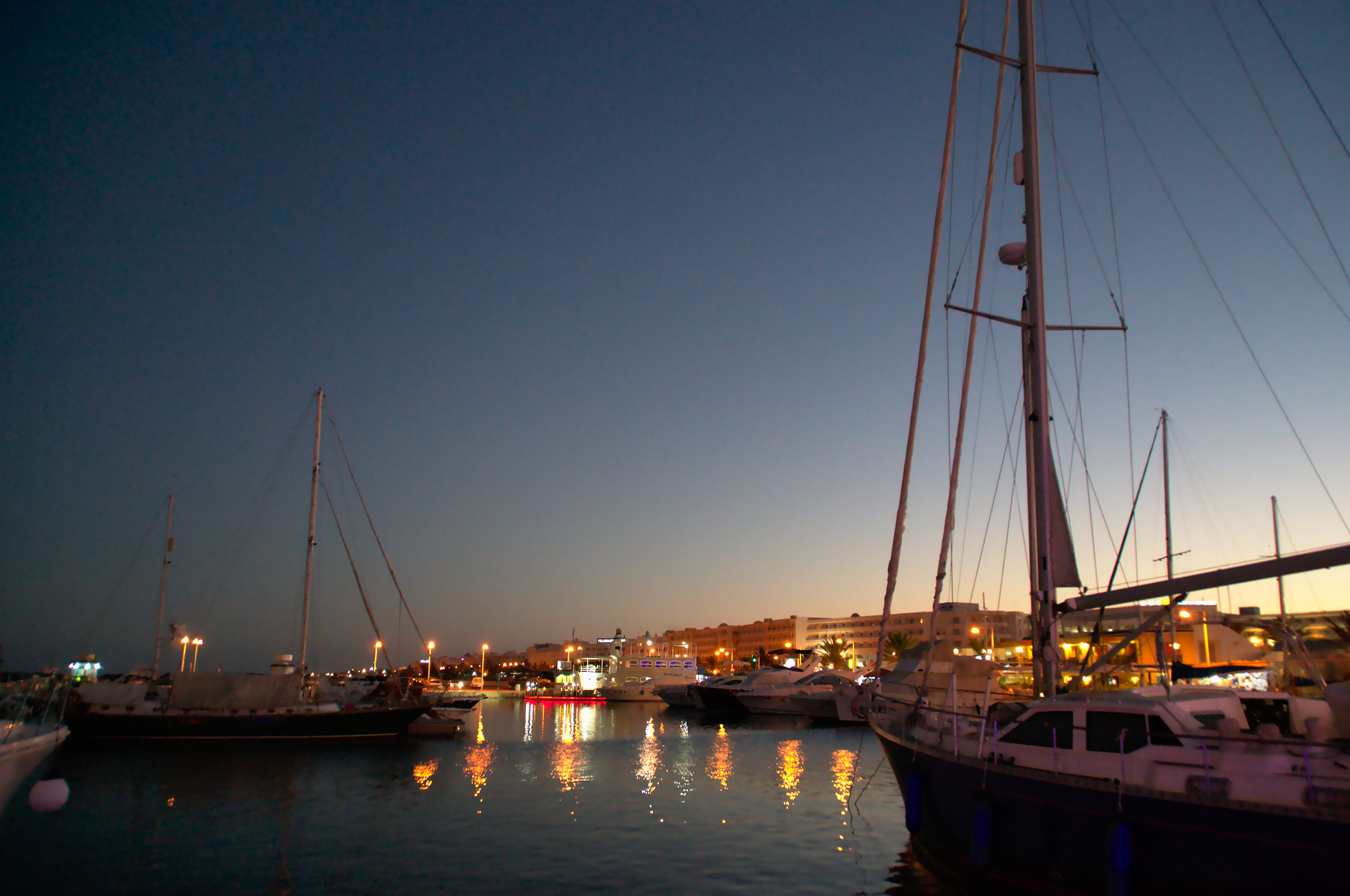

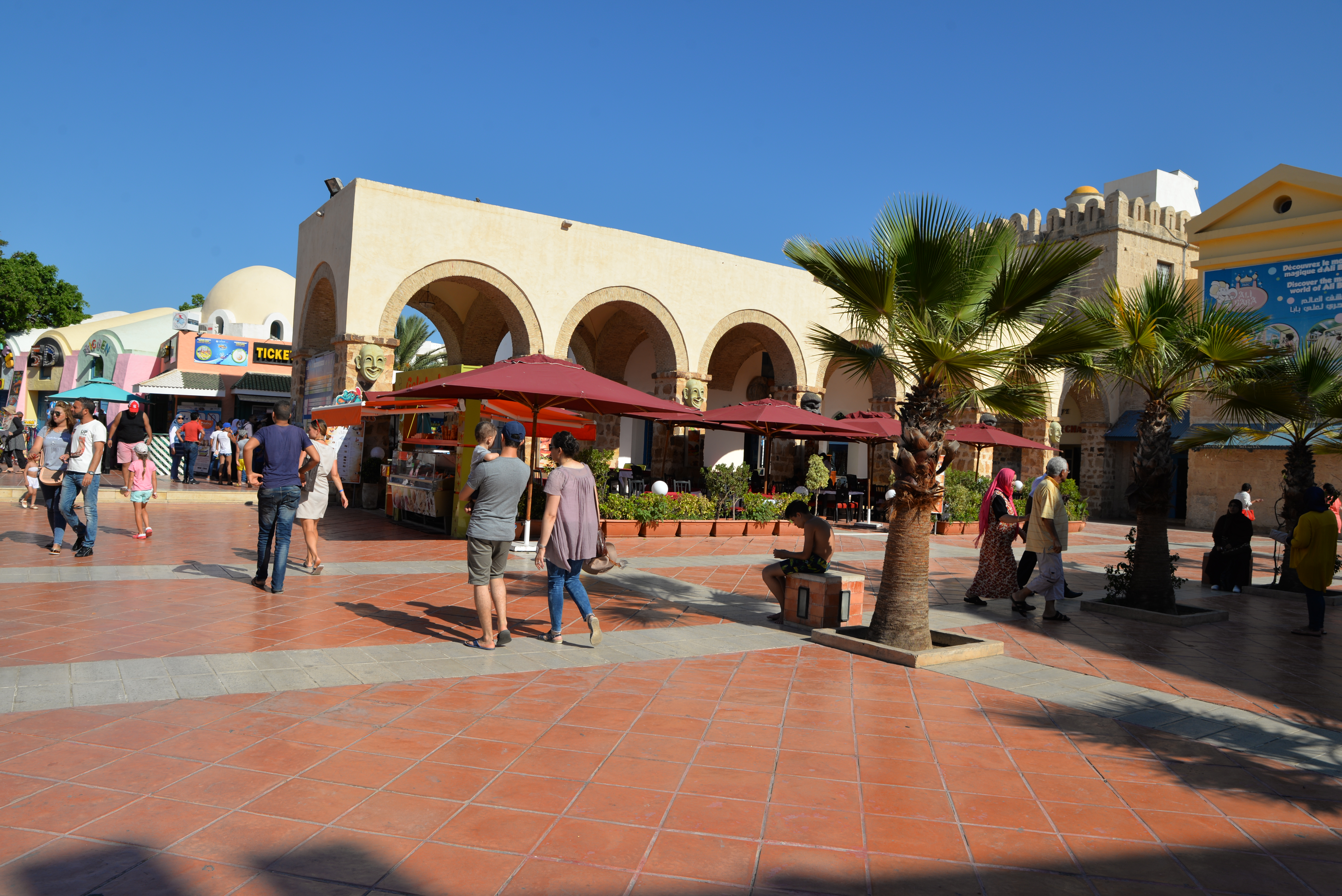

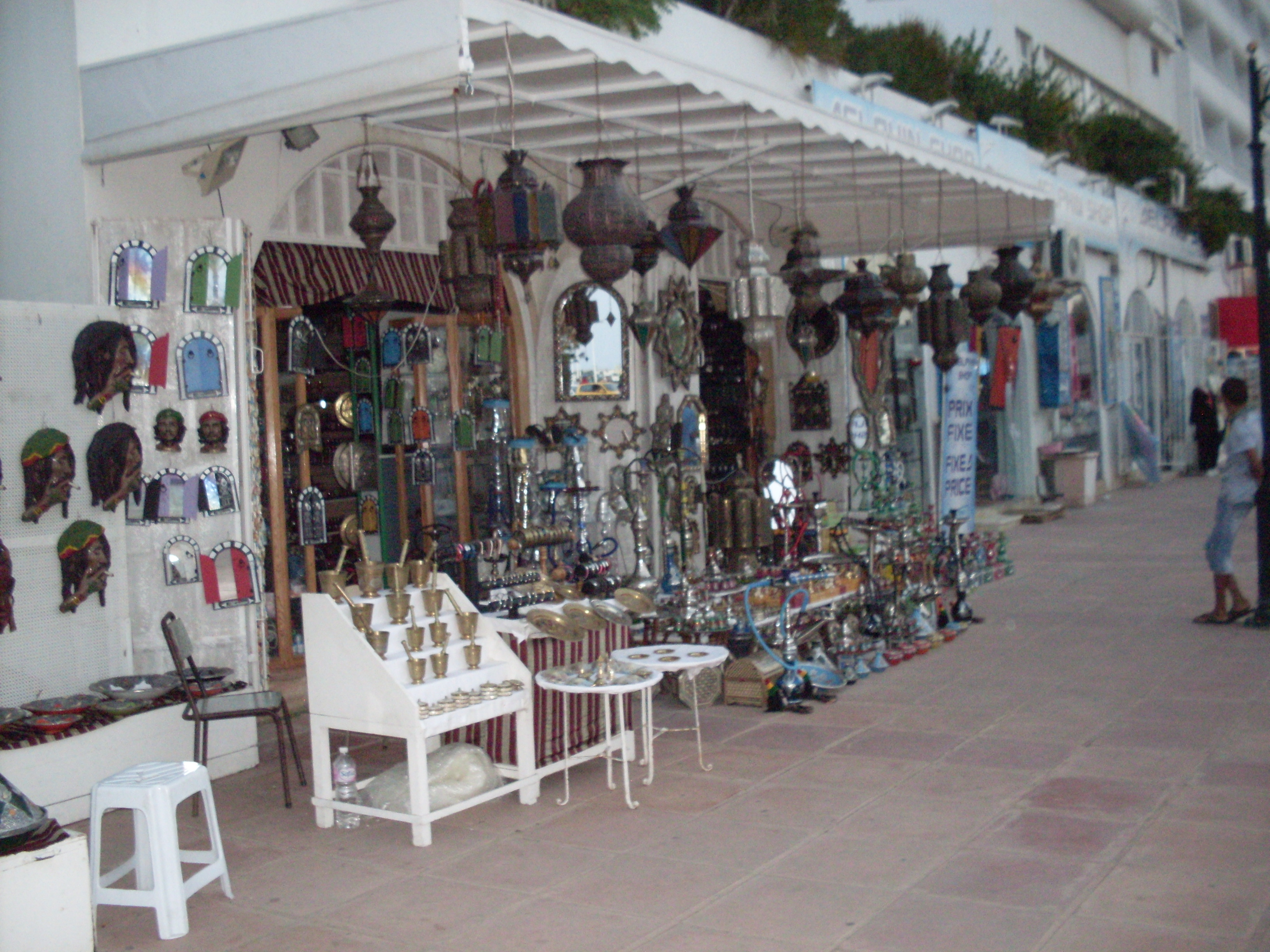

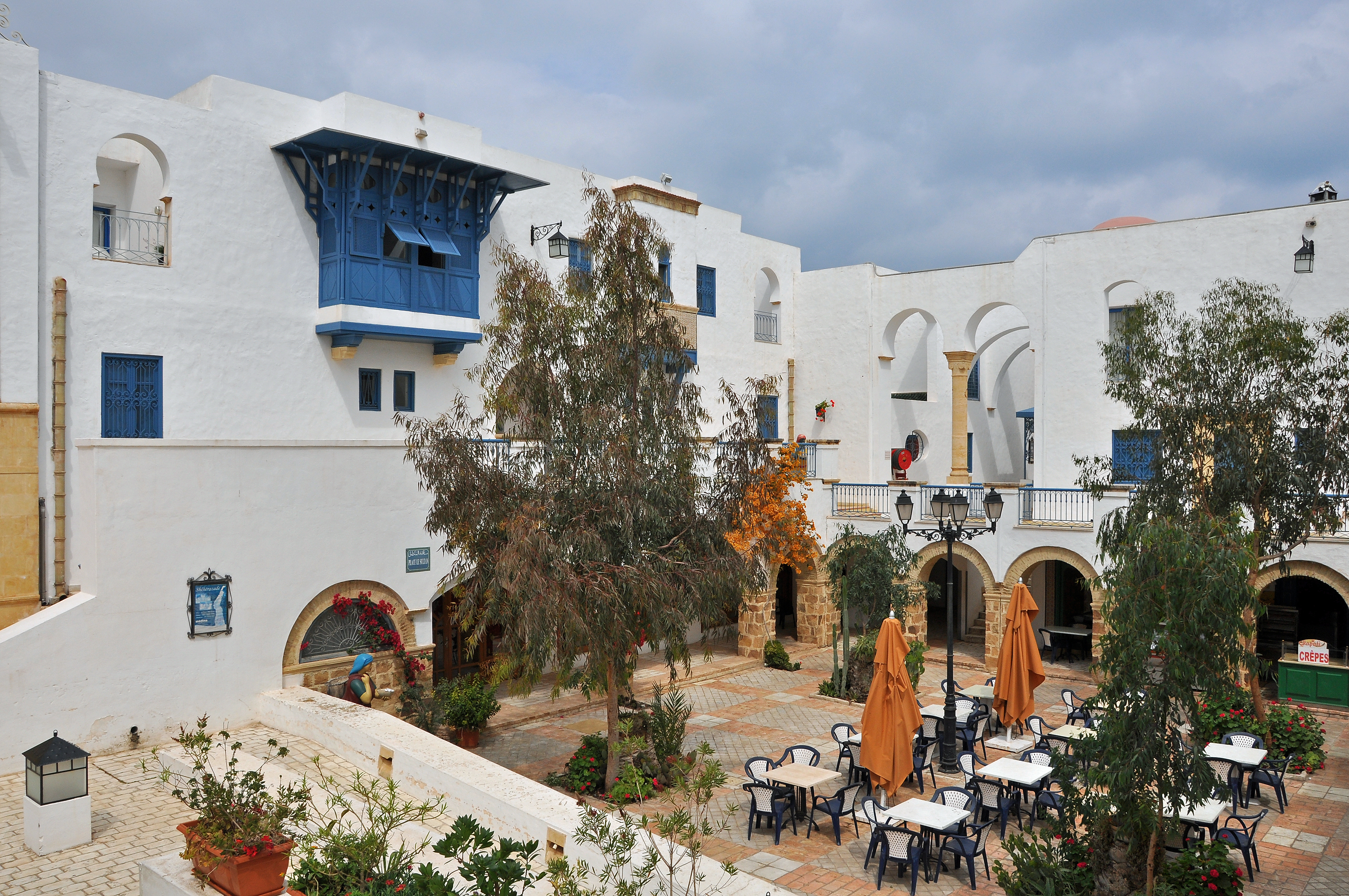

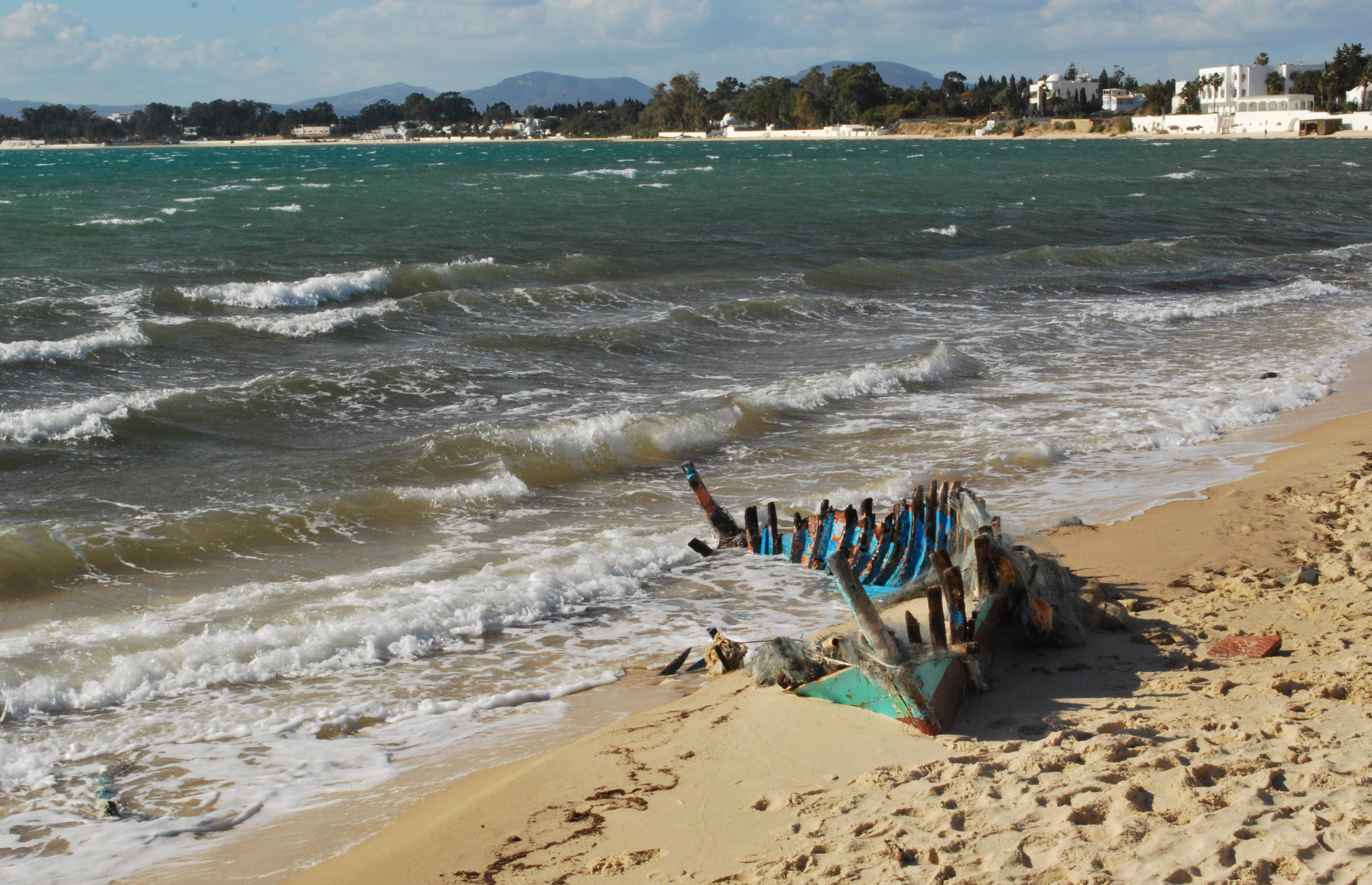

== Notable people ==
- Bettino Craxi, former Italian Prime Minister
- Paul Klee, whose painting Hammamet with its Mosque (1918) is in the Berggruen Klee Collection
- Sophia Loren has a house situated on the beach just outside Hammamet centre
- German footballer Sami Khedira's paternal family is from Hammamet
- Italian Fashion Designer Elsa Schiaparelli owned a house in Hammamet

== Climate ==
The climate is very much like the climate in Sousse. It borders a Hot-summer Mediterranean climate (Csa) and a Hot semi-arid climate (BSh) due to dry ground and hot temperatures in the summer.

== International relations ==
=== Twin towns and sister cities ===
Hammamet is twinned with:

- Nevers, France
- Aqaba, Jordan
