= Hammamet International Festival =

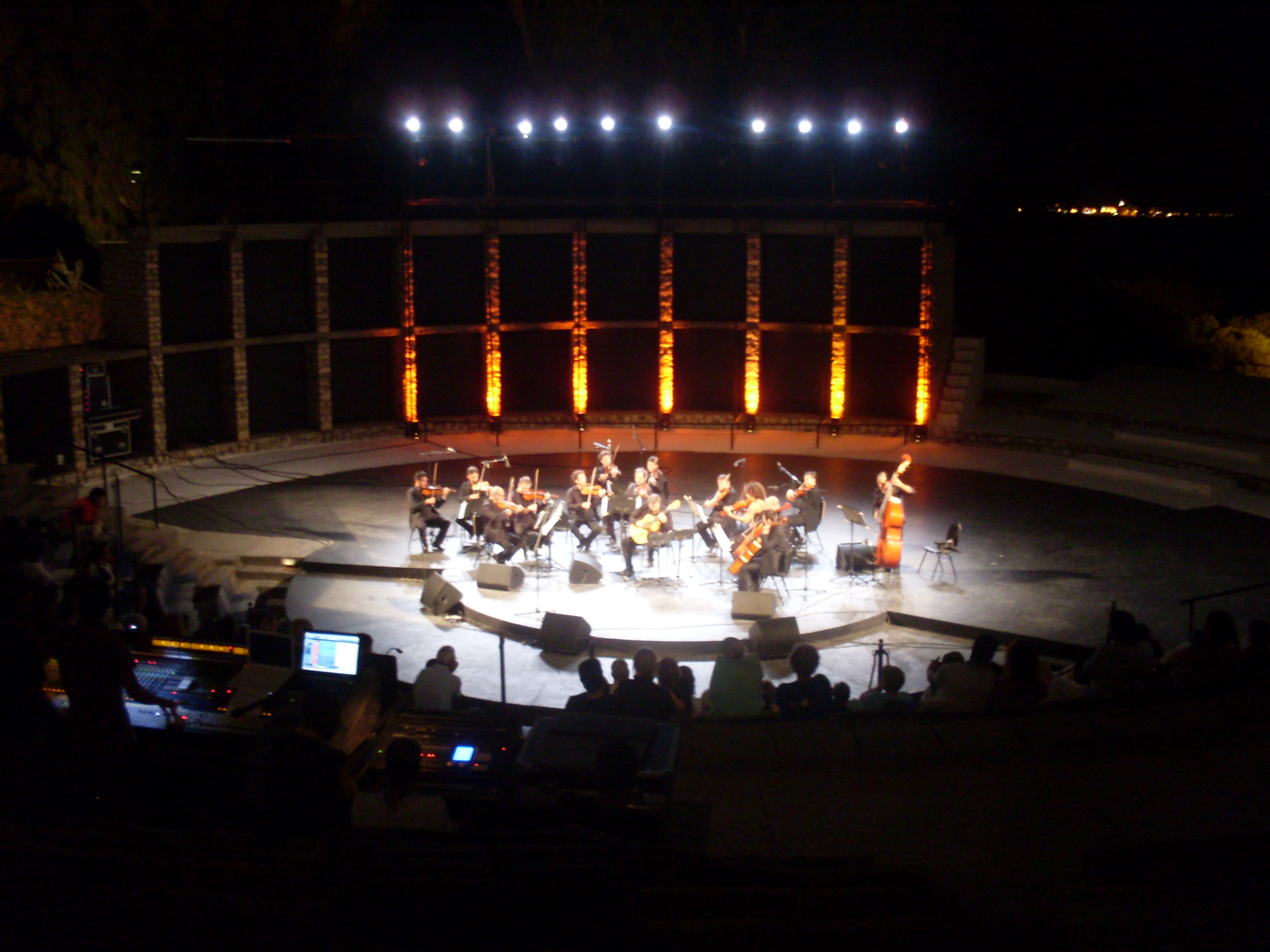
Hammamet International Festival

The Hammamet International Festival (French: Festival international d'Hammamet) (Arabic: مهرجان الحمامات الدولي) is an annual festival of music and art in the coastal city of Hammamet in Tunisia. It was established in 1964 and is held in July and August in the amphitheatre of 1000 seats overlooking the Gulf of Hammamet. It is organized by the Ministry of Culture , which manages and appoints the director. Since 2014, the Centre and the festival have been under the direction of Kamel Ferjani. In the 1980s, Ute Lemper, Mikis Theodorakis, Miriam Makeba made appearances, and more recently, Victoria Abril, Emir Kusturica, Tina Arena, Anouar Brahem, Raouf Ben Yaghlane, Leila Hjaiej and French rap group IAM4 have appeared.
