= Salih Pasha =

Salih Pasha may refer to:

- Nevesinli Salih Pasha (died 1647), Ottoman grand vizier (1645–47)
- Kayserili Hacı Salih Pasha (died 1801 or 1802), Ottoman governor of Bosnia, Egypt, Diyarbekir, and Trabzon
- Salih Hulusi Pasha (1864–1939), Ottoman grand vizier (1920), one of the last

== See also ==
- Salih (name)
- Pasha (title)
