= Salah Farzit =

Tunisian singer and composer (1953–2026)

- صالح الفرزيط
- Born: 1 June 1953
- Died: 18 July 2026 (aged 73)
- Occupations: Singer; Composer

Salah Farzit (Arabic: صالح الفرزيط; 1 June 1953 – 18 July 2026) was a Tunisian singer and composer. He specialized in the use of the mezoued and was considered a pioneer in Tunisian popular music.

== Life and career ==
Born on 1 June 1953, Farzit's music gained popularity from music festival and radio airplay. This rise was highlighted in the documentary Art du Mezoued : chute d'un art marginal dans l'oubli. He told Diwan FM of his innovation to bring Western music influence to traditional Tunisian instruments. Raseef22 described his music as "sonic modernity". Despite his popularity, he was overlooked by Tunisian cultural institutions, often unknown in official circles. He appeared at the Hammamet International Festival in 2022, which marked a rare moment of official recognition. He was hospitalized from a health scare in February 2024, and the Ministry of Culture intervened to send him to a private hospital.

Farzit died on 18 July 2026, at the age of 73.

== Discography ==
- Irdha Alina Ya Lommima (1976)
- Migouda (2005)
- Janna Ouitrafek Nar (2016)
- Ya Masaherni el Leil (2016)
