= El Mida =

Coordinates: 36°44′N 10°51′E

El Mida الميدة
- Commune and town
- Interactive map of El Mida
- Country: Tunisia
- Governorate: Nabeul Governorate

Population (2014)
  - Total: 4,176
- Time zone: UTC+1 (CET)

El Mida is a town and commune in the Nabeul Governorate, in the north-eastern part of Tunisia. As of 2004, it had a population of 3,437.

Stade sportif midien, based in El Mida, is a handball team that plays in the Tunisian Handball League (B Division).

== See also ==
- List of cities in Tunisia
