= Beni Salah =

Beni Salah (or other spelling variations) may refer to:

- Bni Salah, a small town in Tangier-Tétouan region of Morocco
- Bani Saleh Rural District, Khuzestan Province, Iran
- Banū Salih rulers of the Kingdom of Nekor, in present-day Morocco
- Beni Saleh tribe living near Blida in Algeria, speakers of Kabyle
- Beni Salah mountain near Souk Ahras, Algeria

== See also ==
- Salah (name)
- Hammam Béni Salah, a town and commune in El Taref Province, Algeria
- Ibn al-Salah (1181 CE/577 AH – 1245/643)
