= Salah Ameidan =

Saharawi long-distance runner

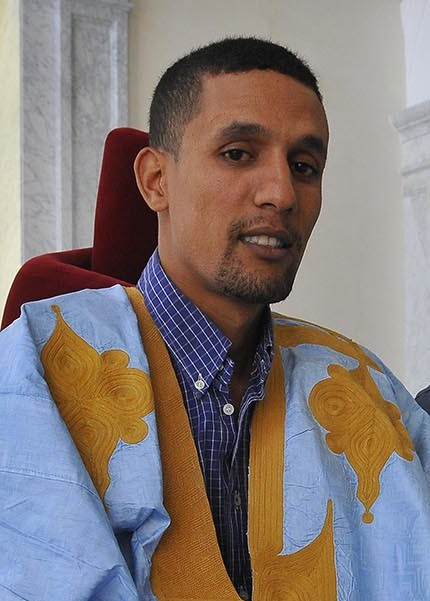

Personal information
- Nationality: Sahrawi
- Born: 1982 (age 43–44) El Aiun, Western Sahara

Sport
- Sport: Long-distance running
- Club: Competes with a French team

Salah Ameidan (born 1982) is a Saharawi long-distance runner. He was the triple cross-country champion for Morocco, and was a two-time Arab World Champion. In 2013 a film, called The Runner, was released about him by the Egyptian/Palestinian/British documentary film maker Saeed Taji Farouky.

Ameidan grew up in El Aiun. At the age of 12, he was recruited for the Moroccan running team and sent to Rabat to train. For ten years he participated in international races under the Moroccan flag. By 1999 he stood as the triple cross-country champion for Morocco, had won 2nd place in the Africa Championships, and twice was the Arab World Champion.

In 2004 during a race in France, where he participated under the Moroccan flag, Ameidan raised the Saharawi flag above his head during the last few hundred metres of the race. Immediately afterwards he sought political asylum in France, as this action would likely have led to imprisonment in Morocco. Ameidan was imprisoned for a short period in 2009 after participating in a demonstration in El Aiun.

Since 2004 he has been competing with a French team in competitions organized by the French Sport Federations, but competing as a Sahrawi athlete in international competitions.
