= Salah Sid =

- Born: 20 June 1950 (age 75); Algiers, Algeria
- Occupations: broadcaster, journalist, voice-over artist, actor,
- Employer: BBC World Service

Mohamed Salah Sid (Arabic: محمد الصالح الصيد), (born 20 June 1950) is an Algerian-born British radio broadcaster, producer and voice-over artist who has worked for the British Broadcasting Corporation in the United Kingdom for most of his career.

He began his career at Radio-Télévision Algérienne (RTA) as an actor and presenter in the 1970s, where he presented television and radio shows such as Good Morning (صباح الخير) and Between High Schools (بين الثانويات,).

Sid has been a leading personality in North Africa and the Middle East, where his voice has become a trademark to millions of Arabic-speaking listeners around the world for decades; "Huna London" (هنا لندن) are considered two of the most famous words since the establishment of the BBC Arabic Service in 1936.

== Early life ==
In the early stages of his career in the late 1960s, Sid trained as an actor at the Conservatoire de Musique et Déclamation (Conservatory of Music & Dramatic Arts) in Algiers, where he performed several stageplays.

Between 1970 and 1979, Sid went on to work as an actor and presenter at Radio-Télévision Algérienne (RTA), a radio and television centre in Algiers, where he wrote and performed in radio dramas, and presented both radio and television programmes. But he was perhaps best known as a presenter of Between High Schools, a site-specific television and radio show resembling University Challenge.

In 1979, at the age of just 29, Sid was selected as the first ever Algerian broadcaster at the BBC World Service, where he broke picket lines in creating a completely new style of radio broadcasting. He later began voice-coaching broadcasters in his new style, commenting that it made the broadcaster sound "less like a dictator and more like a democrat".

== Radio work ==
Sid has conducted interviews, covered conflicts, presented documentary features, and broadcast the news and current affairs for over 35 years at the BBC World Service.

In 2012, the BBC World Service moved from Bush House, its iconic home for over 70 years, to Broadcasting House. Sid said of the move, "The BBC Arabic Service will not be the same".

== Journalism ==
=== Coverage of the Algerian political conflict, 1991 ===
Algerian Civil War 1992-2002

The Algerian Civil War began in December 1991, when the Islamic Salvation Front (FIS) party gained popularity amongst the Algerian people and the National Liberation Front (FLN) party, fearing the former's victory, cancelled the elections after the first round. At this time the country's military, Algerian People's National Army (APNA), effectively took control of the government, and president Chadli Bendjedid was forced from office.

After the FIS was banned and thousands of its members arrested, Islamist guerrillas rapidly emerged and began an armed campaign against the government and its supporters. It is estimated to have cost between 150,000 and 200,000 lives, where more than 70 journalists were assassinated, either by security forces or by Islamists.

The conflict effectively ended with a government victory, following the 1997 surrender of the Islamic Salvation Army (AIS) and the 2002 defeat of the Armed Islamic Group (GIA). However, low-level fighting still continues in some areas.

Media Coverage

In 1991, Sid covered the Algerian political conflict for the weekday BBC news bulletins and BBC News. Many of his broadcasts were syndicated across the United Kingdom, United States, France and Germany.

Sid produced and presented a Panorama programme, which investigated the cancellation of the first round of the 1991 legislative elections. He used a report in which he interviewed the leaders of the three main parties: Abdelhamid Mehri (FLN), Hocine Aït Ahmed (Socialist Forces Front/FFS), as well as the new leader of the FIS, Abdelkader Hachani, just moments before his arrest in 1991.

On 22 November 1999, a few years after his interview with Sid, Hachani, the former FIS leader, was assassinated in the waiting room of a dental clinic in the Bab el Oued district of Algiers.

== Voice work ==
As an acclaimed voice actor of the Middle East and North America, Sid gained prominence as a voice-over artist. He recorded commercials for various companies, including Sony, Samsung, Disney, Adidas, British Airways, Kellogg's, Citibank and QatarEnergy LNG.

=== Television (selected) ===
2002 - Sahara with Michael Palin

2005 - Holy Warriors: Richard the Lionheart & Saladin

=== Video games (selected) ===
2000 - Age of Empires

2013 - Total War: Rome II

== Written works ==
Sid has published a number of written works, including:

- Symphony of Silence (1979)
- Edge of Life (1991)

== Personal life ==
Sid is married with three children.
