= Maha Naji Salah =

Yemeni writer

Maha Naji Salah is a Yemeni writer and social activist. She was born in Sanaa in 1978 and studied at the University of Sanaa where she was involved in student journalism. She started writing and publishing short stories in 1996. She has since gone on to found an NGO called the Ebhar Foundation for Childhood and Creativeness.
