= Salih Kuru =

Turkish soldier

- Born: 1906
- Died: January 6, 2012 (aged 105–106); Kastamonu
- Occupation: Military personnel

Salih Kuru (c. 1906 – January 6, 2012 in Kastamonu) was one of the last surviving veterans of the Turkish War of Independence.

== Death ==
Salih Kuru died in Anatolian Hospital on January 6, 2012, after spending three days in intensive care.
