= Ebyan Mahamed Salah =

Somalian diplomat

- Ebyan Mahamed Salah in 2023

Permanent Representative of Somalia to the United Nations
- Incumbent
- Assumed office 29 June 2022

Personal details
- Education: Carleton University
- Occupation: diplomat

Ebyan Mahamed Salah is a Somalian diplomat. She serves as Permanent Representative of Somalia to the United Nations.

== Career ==
Salah holds a bachelor's degree in sociology/anthropology and a master's degree in sociology from Carleton University. She was an advisor to the Prime Minister of the Transitional Federal Government of Somalia from 2004 to 2007 and joined the Ministry of Foreign Affairs on 9 May 2007. Salah previously served as ambassador to India. She was later ambassador to Austria. She was appointed to the United Nations Office at Geneva by Tatiana Valovaya in 2019.

== See also ==
- List of current permanent representatives to the United Nations
