= Gulf of Hammamet =

Gulf in Tunisia

- خليج الحمامات (Tunisian Arabic)
- Location in Tunisia
- Coordinates: 36°5′N 10°45′E
- Ocean/sea sources: Mediterranean
- Basin countries: Tunisia
- Max. length: 32 km (20 mi)
- Max. width: 75 km (47 mi)
- Settlements: Hammamet

Gulf of Hammamet (Tunisian Arabic: خليج الحمامات) is a large gulf in northeastern Tunisia.

== Geography ==
The Gulf of Hammamet is located south of the Cape Bon peninsula. To the other side of the Cape Bon peninsula is the Gulf of Tunis.

Hammamet, a popular vacation resort city, lies at the northwestern edge of the gulf.
