= Bou Argoub =

Coordinates: 36.54°N 10.55°E

Bou Argoub بوعرقوب
- Commune and town
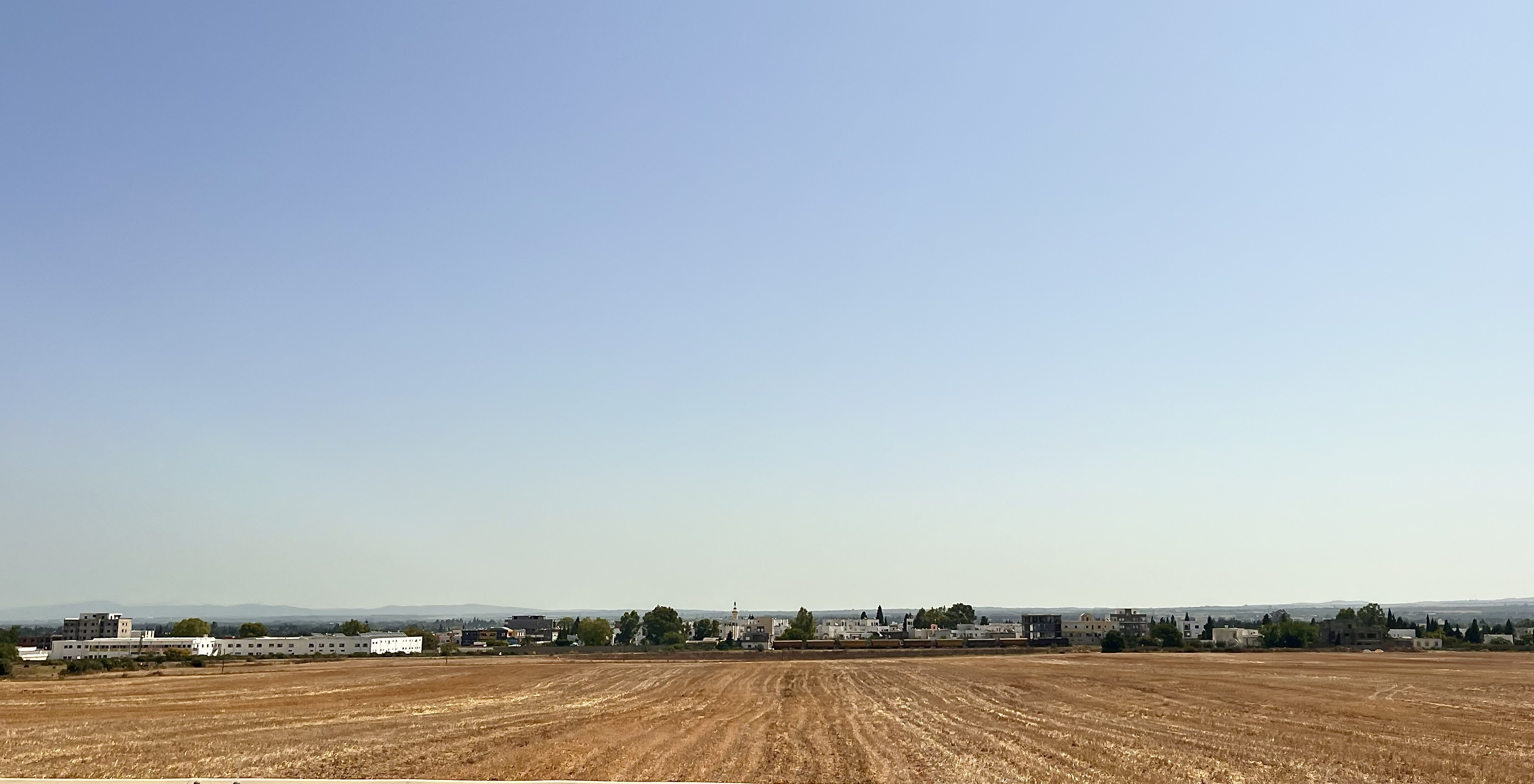
- Interactive map of Bou Argoub
- Country: Tunisia
- Governorate: Nabeul Governorate

Population (2014)
  - Total: 12,312
- Time zone: UTC+1 (CET)

Bou Argoub is a town and commune in the Nabeul Governorate, Tunisia. As of 2004 it had a population of 10,331.

== See also ==
- List of cities in Tunisia
