= Martin Thomas (historian) =

British historian (born 1964)

Professor Martin Thomas (born 1964) is a British historian specialised in decolonisation and its interactions with globalisation.

Thomas did both his undergraduate and doctoral studies at Oxford University, completing his D.Phil. in 1991. He joined the history department at the University of the West of England, Bristol, in 1992 before leaving to take up a post at the History Department of Exeter University in 2003. He is the director of the Centre for the Study of War, State and Society.

He is considered one of the leading specialists on French colonial history and, in November 2002, was awarded a £50,000 prize from the Leverhulme Trust for the outstanding quality of his research. He has published five monographs on aspects of French foreign and colonial policy, Franco-British relations, colonial security services and the colonial state.

He has been on the editorial boards of The International History Review and Intelligence and National Security.

== Works ==
- Britain, France and Appeasement: Anglo-French Relations in the Popular Front Era. Oxford: Berg. 1996.
- "Deferring to Vichy in the Western Hemisphere: The St Pierre and Miquelon Affair of 1941". The International History Review. 19 (4). November 1997.
- The French Empire at War, 1940-45. Manchester University Press. 1998. Paperback 2007.
- The French North African Crisis: Colonial Breakdown and Anglo-French Relations, 1945-62. London: Macmillan. 2000.
- (co-editor with Kent Fedorowich), International Diplomacy and Colonial Retreat. London: Frank Cass. 2001.
- "Bedouin Tribes and the Imperial Intelligence Services in Syria, Iraq and Transjordan in the 1920s". Journal of Contemporary History. 38 (4). October 2003.
- "Albert Sarraut, French Colonial Development, and the Communist Threat, 1919–1930". The Journal of Modern History. 77 (4). December 2005.
- The French Empire between the Wars. Imperialism, Politics, and Society. Manchester University Press. 2005. Paperback 2007.
- Empires of Intelligence: Security Services and Colonial Control. Berkeley: University of California Press. 2007.
- Fight Or Flight: Britain, France, and Their Roads from Empire. Oxford University Press. 2014.
- The End of Empires and a World Remade: A Global History of Decolonization. Princeton University Press. 2024.
