= Salah Bouzrara =

French footballer (born 2000)

Personal information
- Date of birth: 20 January 2000 (age 26)
- Place of birth: Ivry-sur-Seine, France
- Position: Forward

Team information
- Current team: Ouest Tourangeau

Senior career*
Years	Team	Apps	(Gls)
2016–2019	Tours II	18	(6)
2018–2019	Tours	5	(0)
2019–2021	Orléans II	15	(8)
2020–2021	→ Saint-Pryvé Saint-Hilaire (loan)	2	(0)
2022–2023	Angers II	13	(1)
2024–	Ouest Tourangeau	10	(2)
- * Club domestic league appearances and goals as of 7 December 2024

Salah Bouzrara (born 20 January 2000) is a French professional footballer who plays as a forward for Championnat National 3 club Ouest Tourangeau.

== Club career ==
Bouzrara made his debut for Tours in a 3–2 Ligue 2 loss to Gazélec Ajaccio on 20 April 2018. He signed his first professional contract with Orléans on 27 June 2020.

On 9 September 2020, Bouzrara joined Championnat National 2 side Saint-Pryvé Saint-Hilaire on loan for the 2020–21 season.

== Personal life ==
Born in France, Bouzrara is of Tunisian descent.
