= Salah Yaqub =

Somali military general

General Salah Yaqub (Somali: Saalax Yacquub) is a Somali military general. He is the incumbent the Deputy Commander of the 27th Division of Somali Armed Forces
