= Salah Bouakouir =

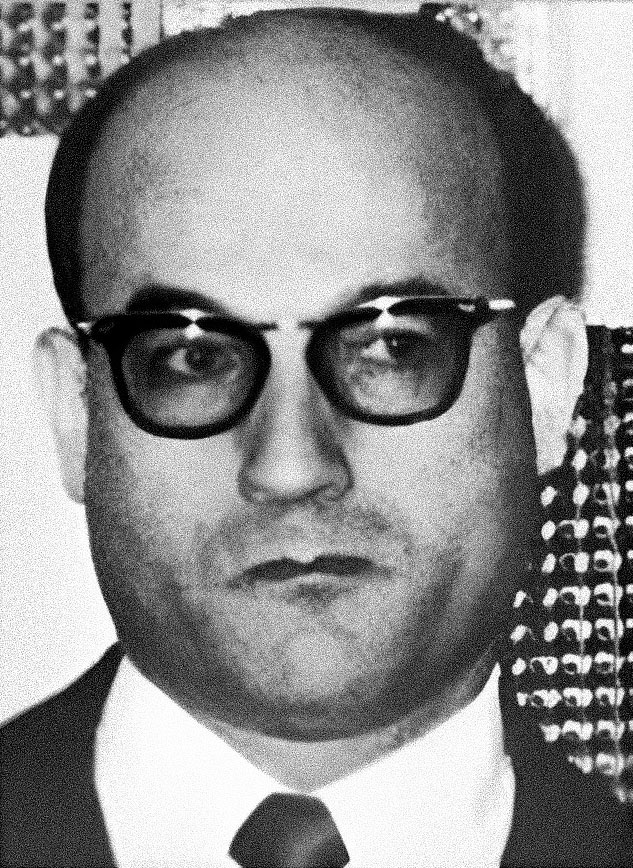
- Born: June 16, 1908
- Died: September 24, 1961 (aged 53)

Salah Bouakouir, whose full name is Salah Mohand Bouakouir, was born on June 16, 1908, in Michelet, Algeria and died on September 24, 1961, in Algeria. He is one of the few Muslims who graduated from the École Polytechnique and entered the General Government of Algeria in 1947 as the Director General of Commerce, Energy, and Industry. Later on, in August 1956, he became the Director of Economic Affairs for the General Government of Algeria.

== Biography ==
Charles de Gaulle had offered him a ministerial position, which he declined. Salah Bouakouir had chaired the Higher Council of the Plan in Constantine.

He died in September 1961 by drowning. Dahou Ould Kablia, former Algerian Minister of the Interior, claimed in 2018 that Bouakouir worked closely with the Ministry of Armaments and General Liaisons (MALG) and transmitted confidential documents on the Algerian economy, and that he was assassinated by French intelligence services.
