= Rabat =

Capital city of Morocco

Rabat الرباط (Arabic) ⵕⵕⴱⴰⵟ (Standard Moroccan Tamazight)
- Capital city
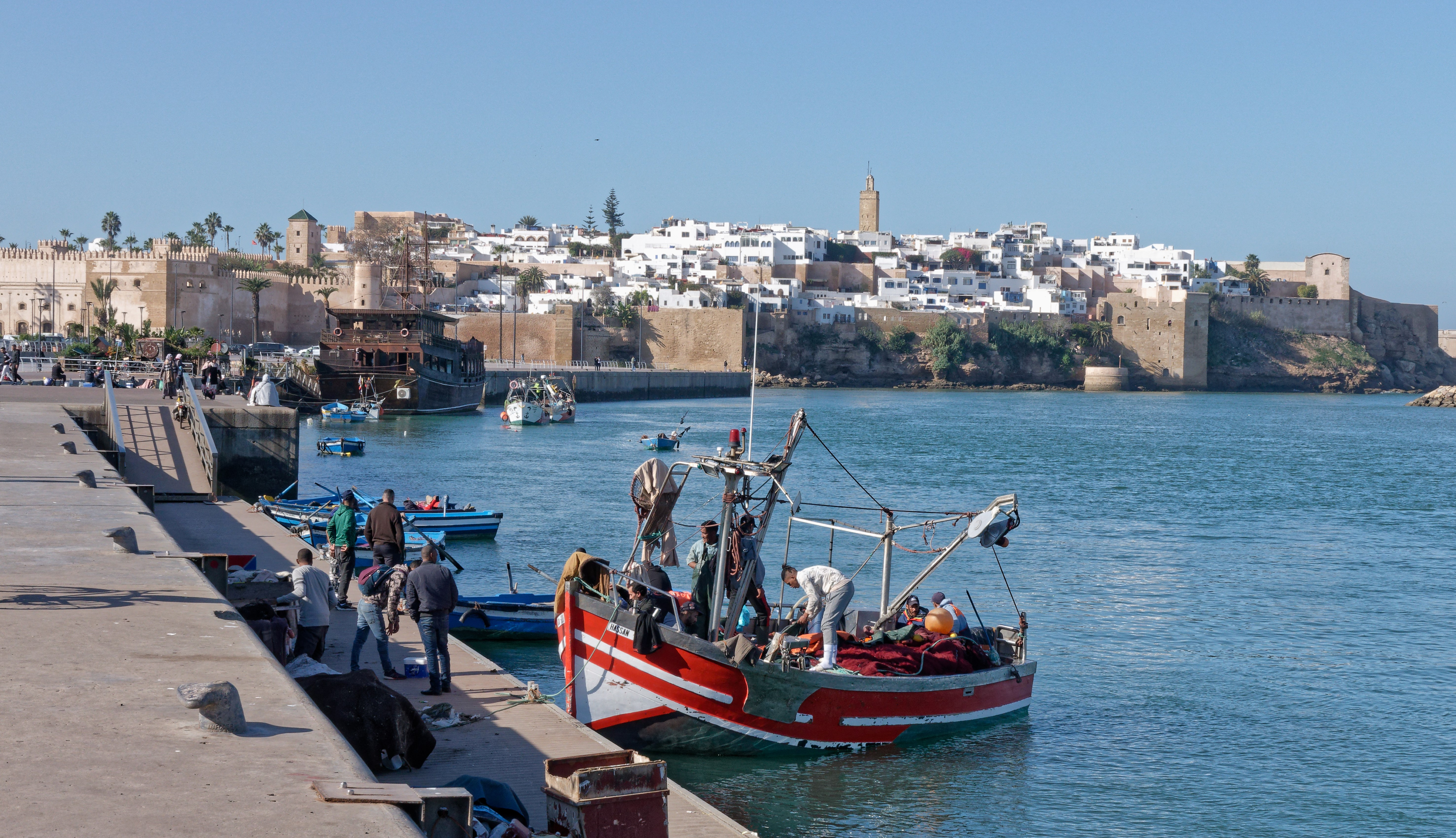
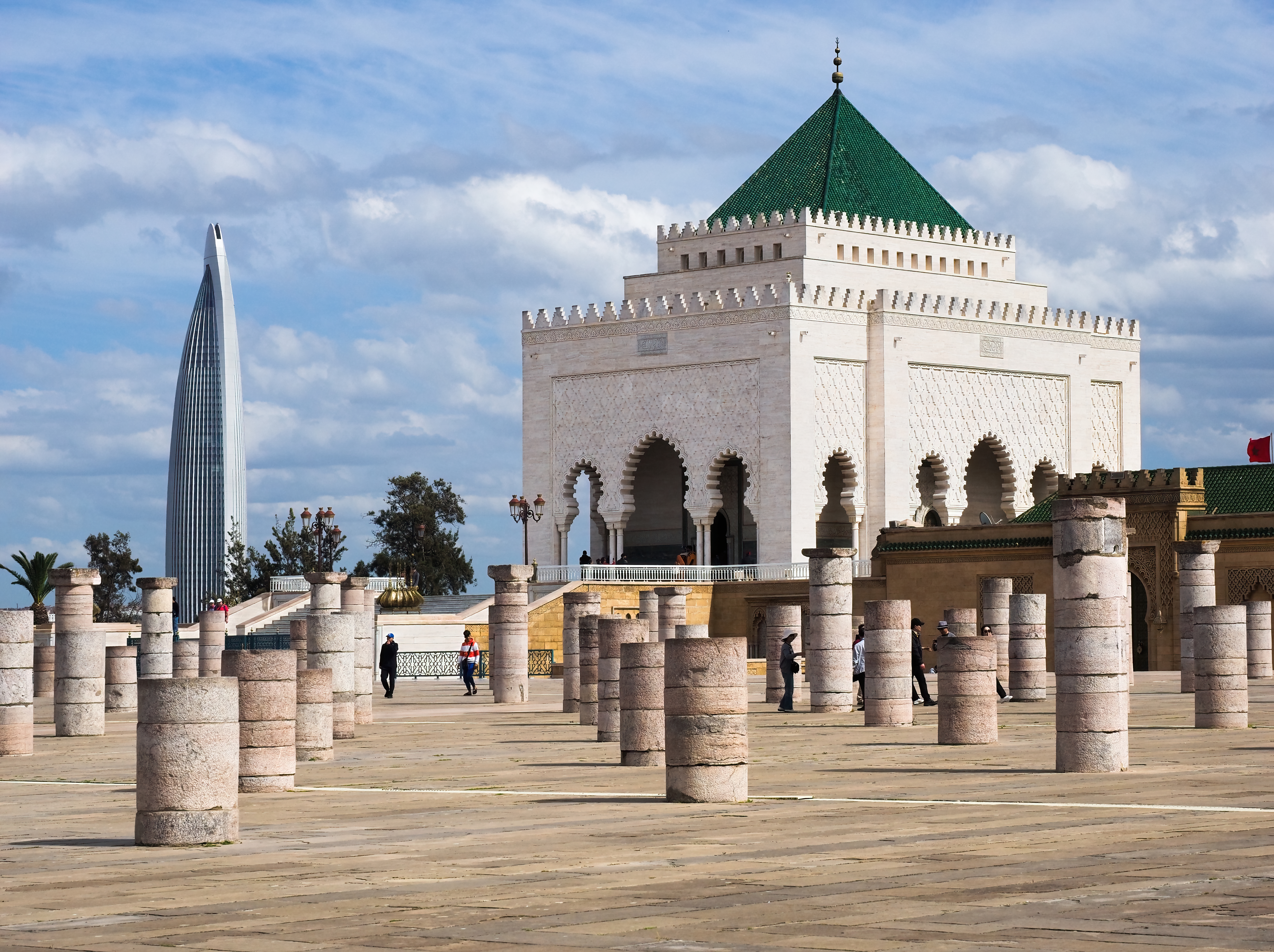
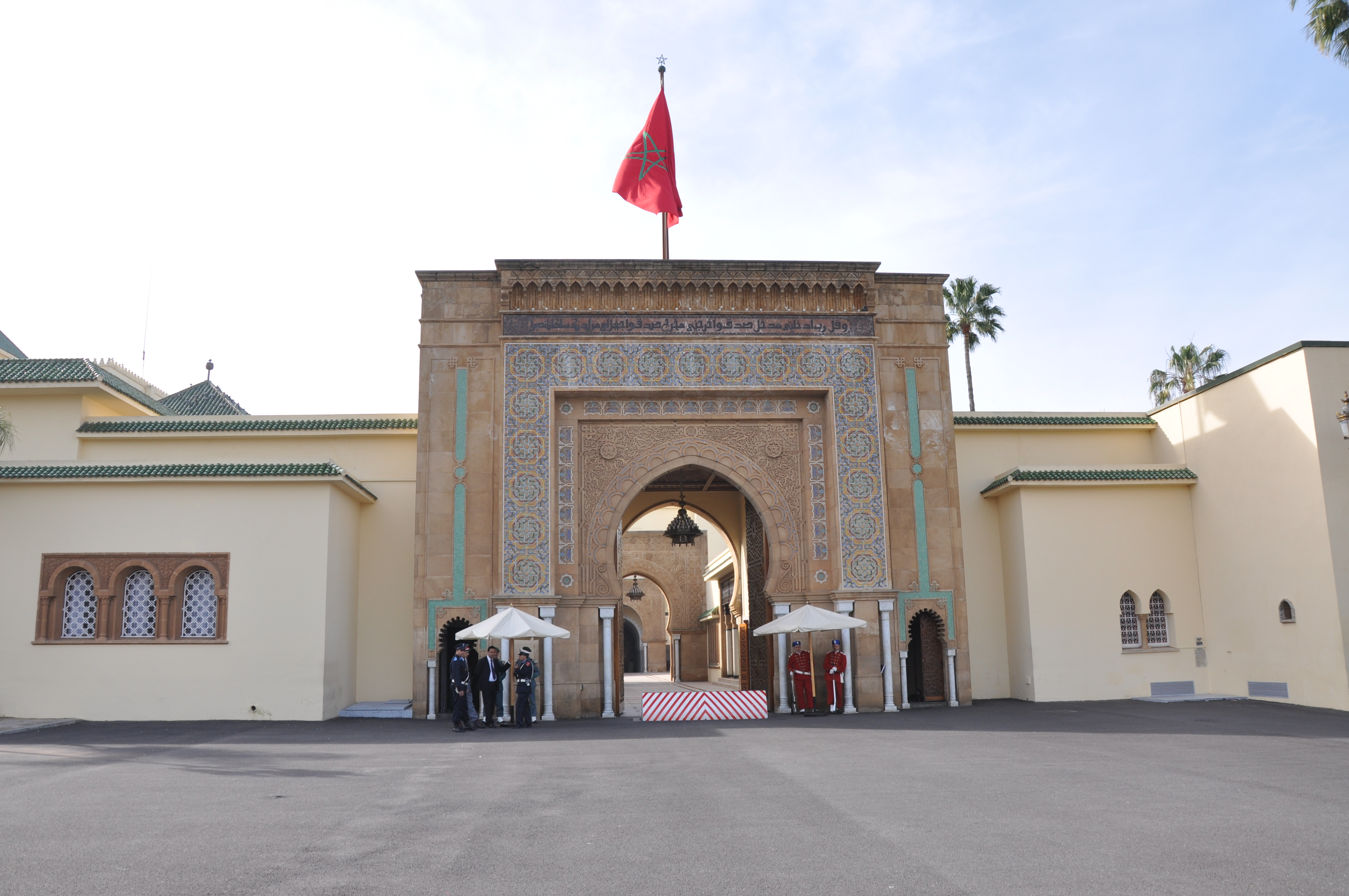
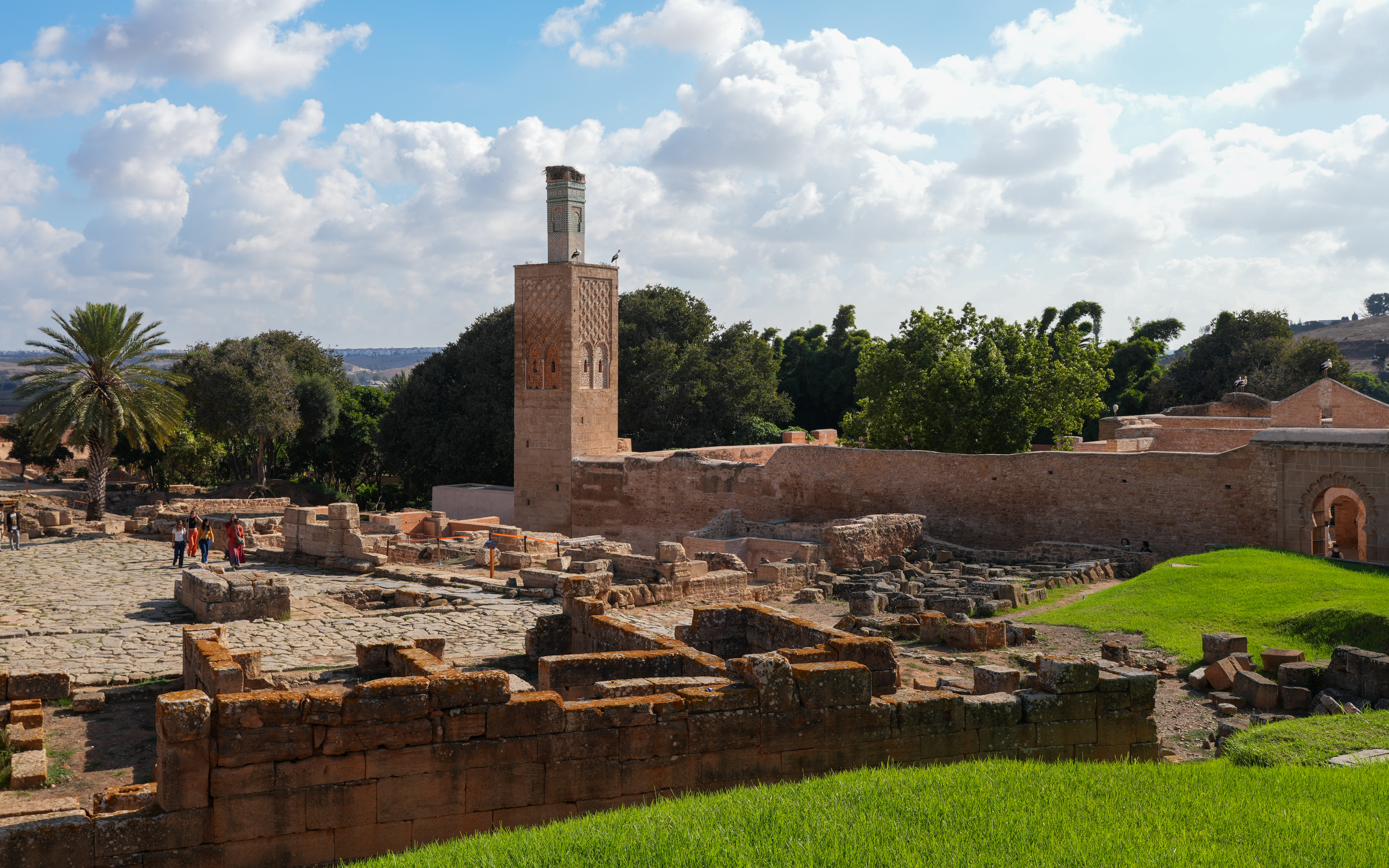
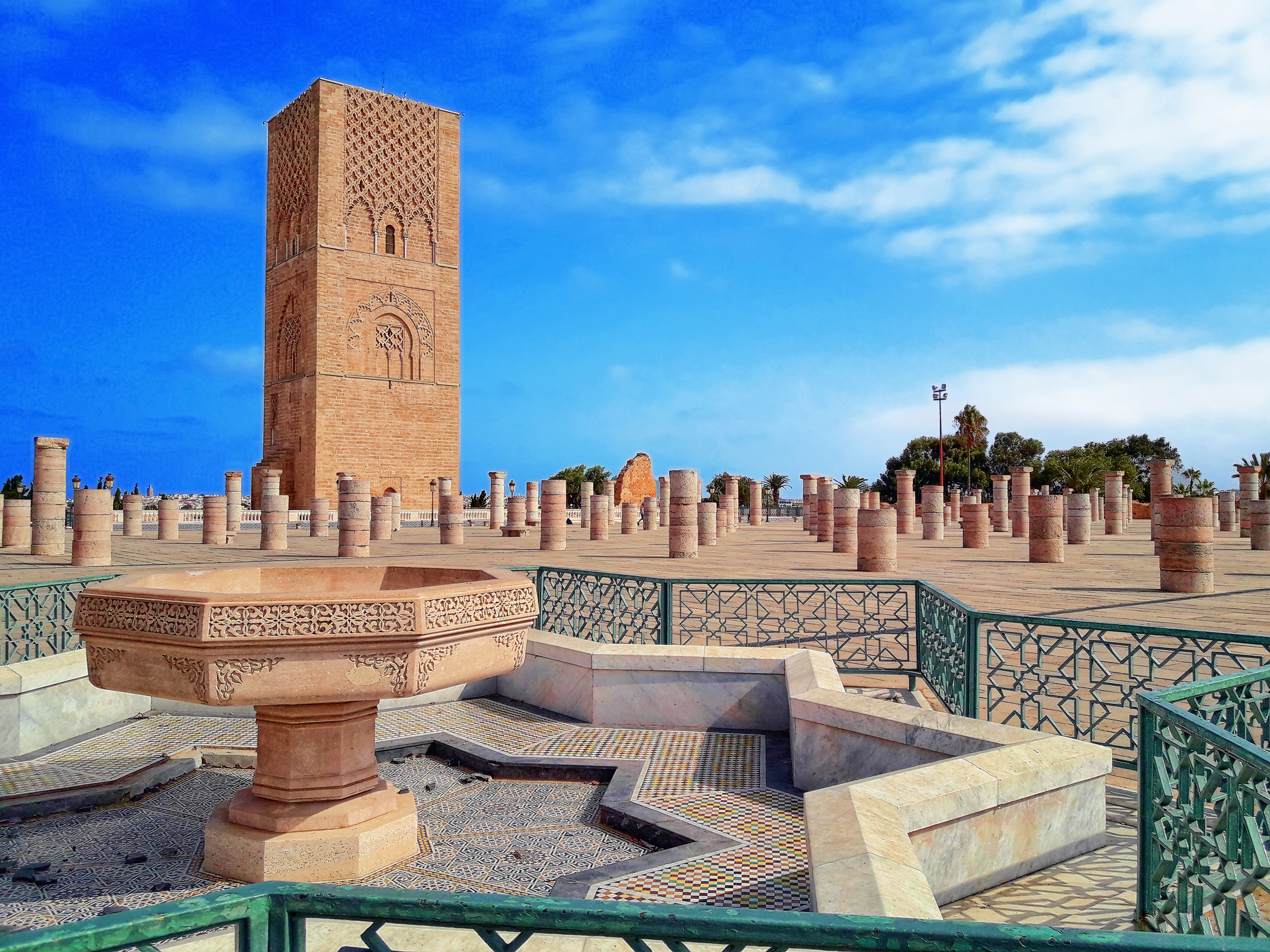
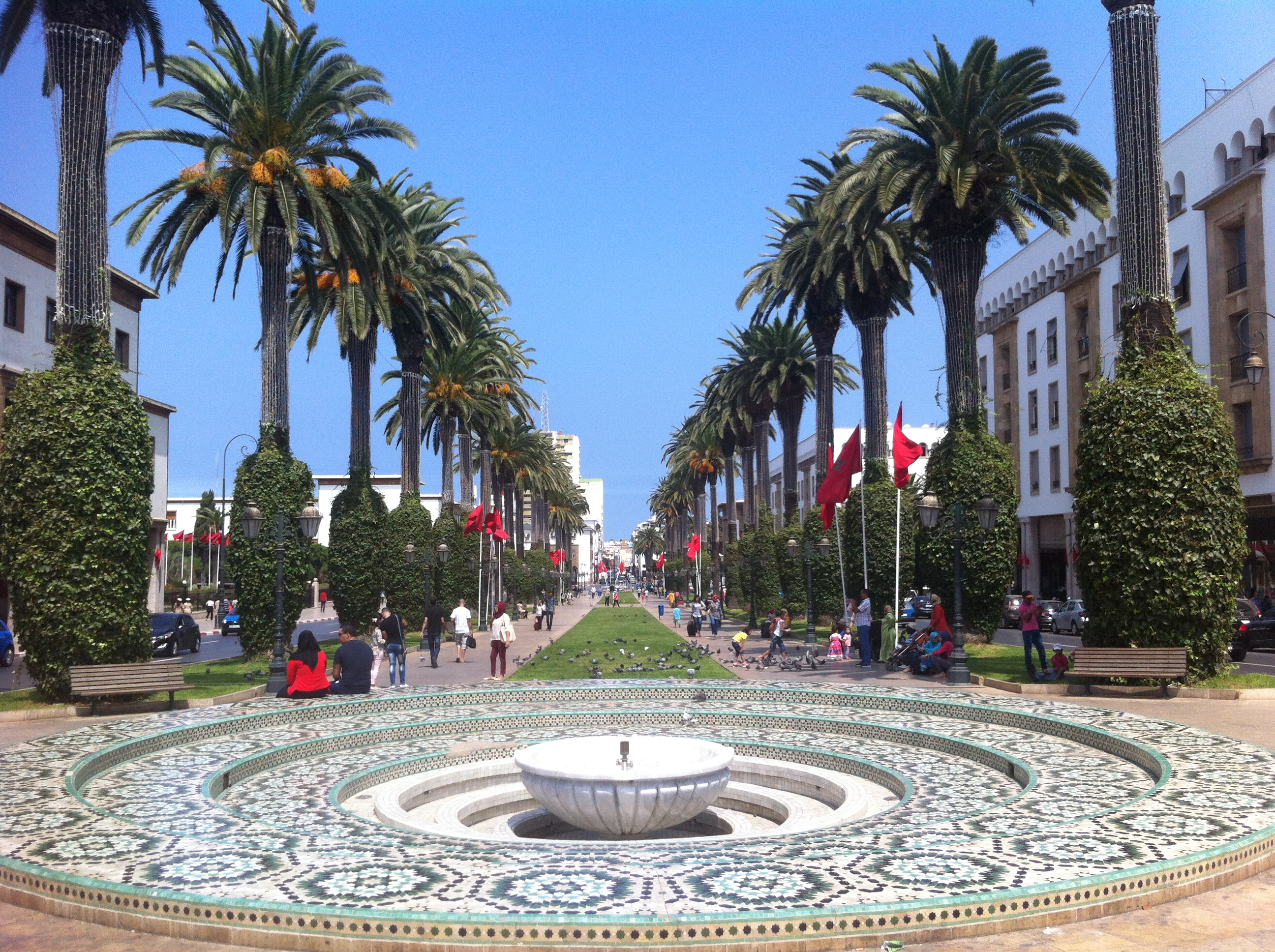
- River Bou Regreg and the Kasbah of the Udayas Mausoleum of Mohammed V Royal Palace Chellah Necropolis Hassan Tower Avenue Mohammed V Prince Moulay Abdellah Stadium

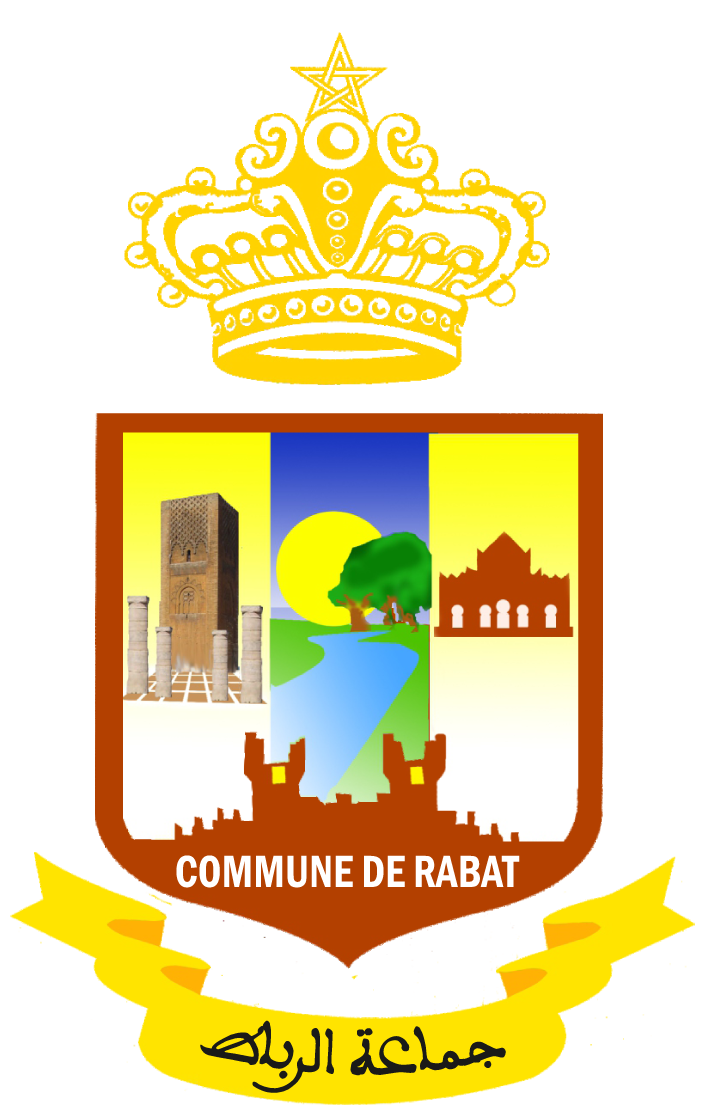
- Seal Wordmark
- Nickname: City of Lights
- Interactive map of Rabat
- Coordinates: 34°01′16″N 6°50′29″W
- Country: Morocco
- Region: Rabat-Salé-Kénitra

Government
  - Mayor: Fatiha El Moudni (RNI)

Area
  - Capital city: 117 km^{2} (45 sq mi)
- Highest elevation: 160 m (520 ft)
- Lowest elevation: 0 m (0 ft)

Population (2024)
  - Capital city: 515,619
  - Rank: 7th in Morocco
  - Density: 4,400/km^{2} (11,400/sq mi)
  - Metro: 2,120,192
- Demonym: Rbati
- Time zone: UTC+0 (GMT)
- Website: mairiederabat.ma/ar-AR

UNESCO World Heritage Site
- Official name: Rabat, Modern Capital and Historic City: a Shared Heritage
- Type: Cultural
- Criteria: ii, iv
- Designated: 2012 (36th session)
- Reference no.: 1401
- Region: Arab States

Rabat (Note: /rəˈbɑːt/, also UK: /rəˈbæt/, US: /rɑːˈbɑːt/ Arabic: الرِّبَاط, romanized: ar-Ribāṭ Standard Moroccan Tamazight: ⵕⵕⴱⴰⵟ) is the capital city of Morocco, located on that country's northwestern Atlantic coast. Rabat is the country's seventh-largest city with a population of 515,619 (2024) and the second largest metropolitan area after Casablanca, with a population of approximately 2.1 million (2025). It is also the capital city of the Rabat-Salé-Kénitra administrative region. Rabat is located on the Atlantic Ocean at the mouth of the river Bou Regreg, opposite Salé, the city's main commuter town.

Rabat was founded in the 12th century by the Almohads. After a period of growth, the city fell into a period of decline. In the 17th century, Rabat became a haven for the Barbary corsairs. When the French established a protectorate over Morocco in 1912, Rabat became its administrative center. When Morocco achieved independence in 1956, Rabat became its capital.

Rabat is one of the four imperial cities of Morocco, and its medina is listed as a World Heritage Site. It is accessible by train through the ONCF system and by plane through the nearby Rabat–Salé Airport.

Rabat is home to the headquarters of several international, regional, and continental organizations, including the Islamic World Educational, Scientific and Cultural Organization (ICESCO), the Arab Maghreb Union, the United Cities and Local Governments of Africa (UCLG Africa), the African Training and Research Centre in Administration for Development (CAFRAD), the Ministerial Conference on Fisheries Cooperation among African States Bordering the Atlantic Ocean (COMHAFAT), and the African Union's African Migration Observatory. The city also hosts the African office of the International Federation of Association Football (FIFA), the regional office for the Maghreb of the United Nations Educational, Scientific and Cultural Organization (UNESCO), and the Regional Office for Africa of the Hague Conference on Private International Law (HCCH), as well as offices of several United Nations agencies.

== Etymology ==
The name Rabat comes from the Arabic word الرباط (a-Ribāṭ) meaning the ribat, an Islamic base or fortification. This name is short for رباط الفتح (Ribāṭu al-Fatḥ) meaning the ribat of conquest or stronghold of victory—a title given by the Almohads when they established the city as a naval base in 1170.

== History ==
=== Ancient Sala ===
In the first millennium BC the Phoenicians founded several trading colonies along the Atlantic coast of what is now Morocco, but the existence of a Phoenician settlement in the area, called Sala or Shallat, has been debated by archeologists. By the first century BC the local inhabitants were still writing in the neo-Punic language, but the region came under the influence of Rome. It was controlled by the ancient Berber Mauretanian Kingdom until it was formally annexed by Rome in the first century BC. On the site now known as Chellah, just south of the walled city today, the Romans built a city named Sala Colonia. Excavations have revealed that older Mauretanian structures existed on the site before Roman structures were built over them. Along with Lixus, Sala Colonia was one of the two main naval outposts held by the Romans on the Atlantic coast of the Mauretania Tingitana province. The port of Sala (now disappeared) was used by commercial Roman ships as a way station on their southwestward passages to Anfa and the Insula Purpuraria (Mogador island).

Archaeological objects of Visigothic and Byzantine origin found in the area attest to the persistence of commercial or political contacts between Sala and Roman Europe, up to the establishment of a Byzantine presence in North Africa during the 7th century. However, Sala began to be abandoned in the 5th century and was mostly in ruins when the Muslim Arabs arrived in the 7th century and established Islamic influence in the region.

=== Medieval Islamic period ===
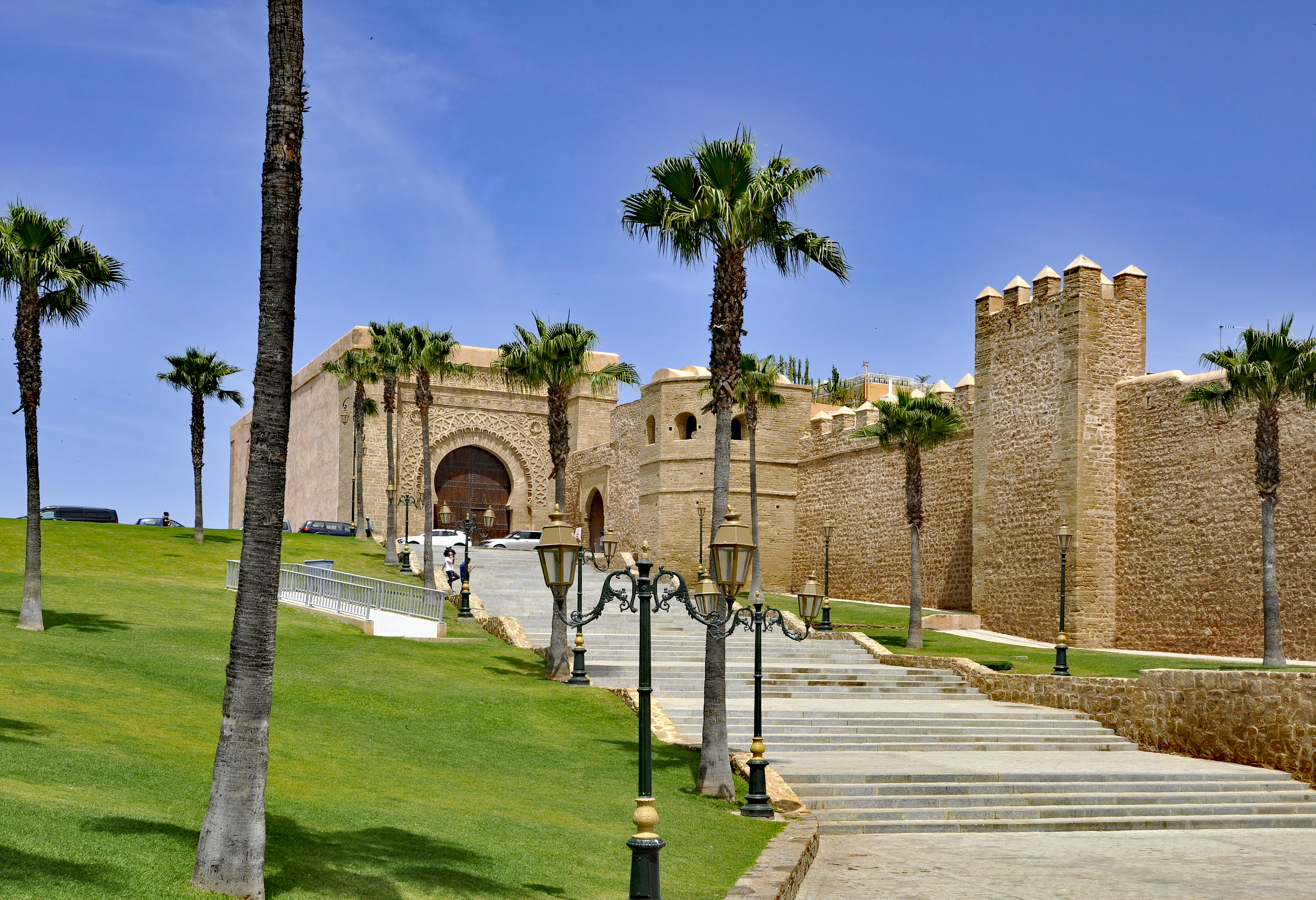
The Kasbah of the Udayas, the citadel built by the Almohads on the site of earlier ribats

In the 10th century the Umayyads of Cordoba, or their Zenata Berber allies in the region, founded a ribat or fortified monastery/outpost in this area, to defend against the Barghawata Berbers who had established a Kharijite state to the south. This ribat was most likely on the same site as the current Kasbah of the Udayas, but its location has not been confirmed by historians. Around 1030, a new town called Salā (the present Salé) was founded on the opposite side of the river (the north side) by the Banu 'Ashara family.

One of the last Almoravid emirs, Tashfin ibn Ali (r. 1143–1145) built a new ribat on the site of the current kasbah as part of his efforts to hold back the Almohads. Almohads nonetheless defeated the Almoravids and destroyed the ribat shortly after. In 1150 or 1151 the Almohad caliph Abd al-Mu'min built a new kasbah (citadel) to replace the former ribat, within which he included a palace and a mosque. This Almohad kasbah corresponds to the current Kasbah of the Udayas (which was expanded in later periods). Abd al-Mu'min also had an underground canal dug to divert a water source to this location, allowing for future settlement and urbanization in the area. The site became a military staging ground for Almohad armies setting out on campaigns to Al-Andalus.

The Almohad caliph Abu Yusuf Ya'qub al-Mansur (r. 1184–1199) embarked on an ambitious project to construct a new fortified imperial capital, called al-Mahdiyya or Ribat al-Fath, on the site of what is now the medina (old city) of Rabat, with new walls extending over a vast area beyond the kasbah. This project also included the construction of an enormous mosque (the remains of which include the Hassan Tower) and of new grand gateways such as Bab er-Rouah and the main gate of the kasbah, now known as Bab Udaya or Bab al-Kbir. After al-Mansur's death in 1199 the mosque and the capital remained unfinished and his successors lacked the resources or the will to finish it. The new city was never fully inhabited and the site was practically abandoned.

During the Marinid dynasty period (13th to 15th centuries), the town of Salé across the river grew more important than the settlements of the south bank. In 1515 Leo Africanus reported that Rabat had declined so much that only 100 inhabited houses remained. The Marinids did build a Great Mosque in what is now the medina of Rabat and on the nearby site of Chellah (ancient Sala) they built a royal necropolis for their dynasty.

=== Corsair republic ===
In 1609, Philip III decreed the expulsion of all Moriscos (people of Muslim or Moorish descent) from Spain. About 2000 of these refugees, originally from the town of Hornachos near Badajoz, Spain, settled around Salé and occupied the kasbah, attracting between 5000 and 14,000 other Moriscos to join them. Rabat and neighboring Salé united to form the Republic of Bou Regreg in 1627. This autonomous republic became a base for corsairs: pirates, also known as the "Salé Rovers", who preyed on merchant ships around the shores of Western Europe.

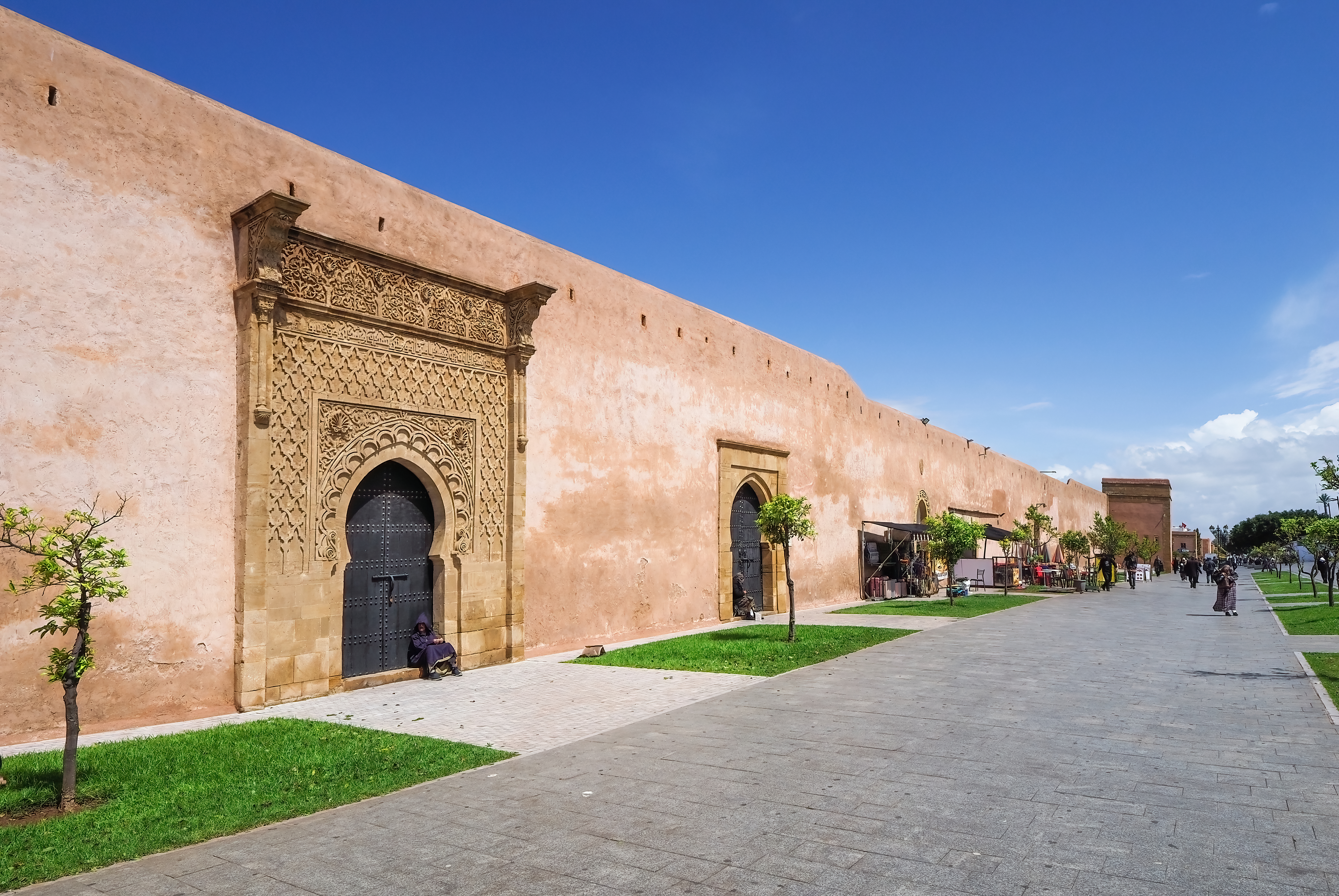
The Andalusian Wall today, added inside the Almohad walled enclosure during the 17th century

During this time, the area below the kasbah on the south bank became more heavily populated due to the Morisco and Andalusi refugees. A new "Andalusian Wall" was built to delimit this area in the northern part of the former Almohad walled city. What is now known as the Street of the Consuls became an important road artery even at this time. The name "Rabat" was not yet in use; the city of the south bank was known as "New Salé" while the city of the north bank was known as "Old Salé". Corsair activities were based in New Salé, whereas the inhabitants of Old Salé generally did not participate in piracy.

=== 'Alawi rule ===
The pirates did not have to contend with any central authority until al-Rashid, the founder of the 'Alawi dynasty, conquered the area in 1666 and united most of Morocco under his rule. Nonetheless, the 'Alawi sultans allowed the piracy to continue up until the reign of Moulay Slimane in the early 19th century. This led to the shelling of the city by Austria in 1829 after an Austrian ship had been lost to a pirate attack.

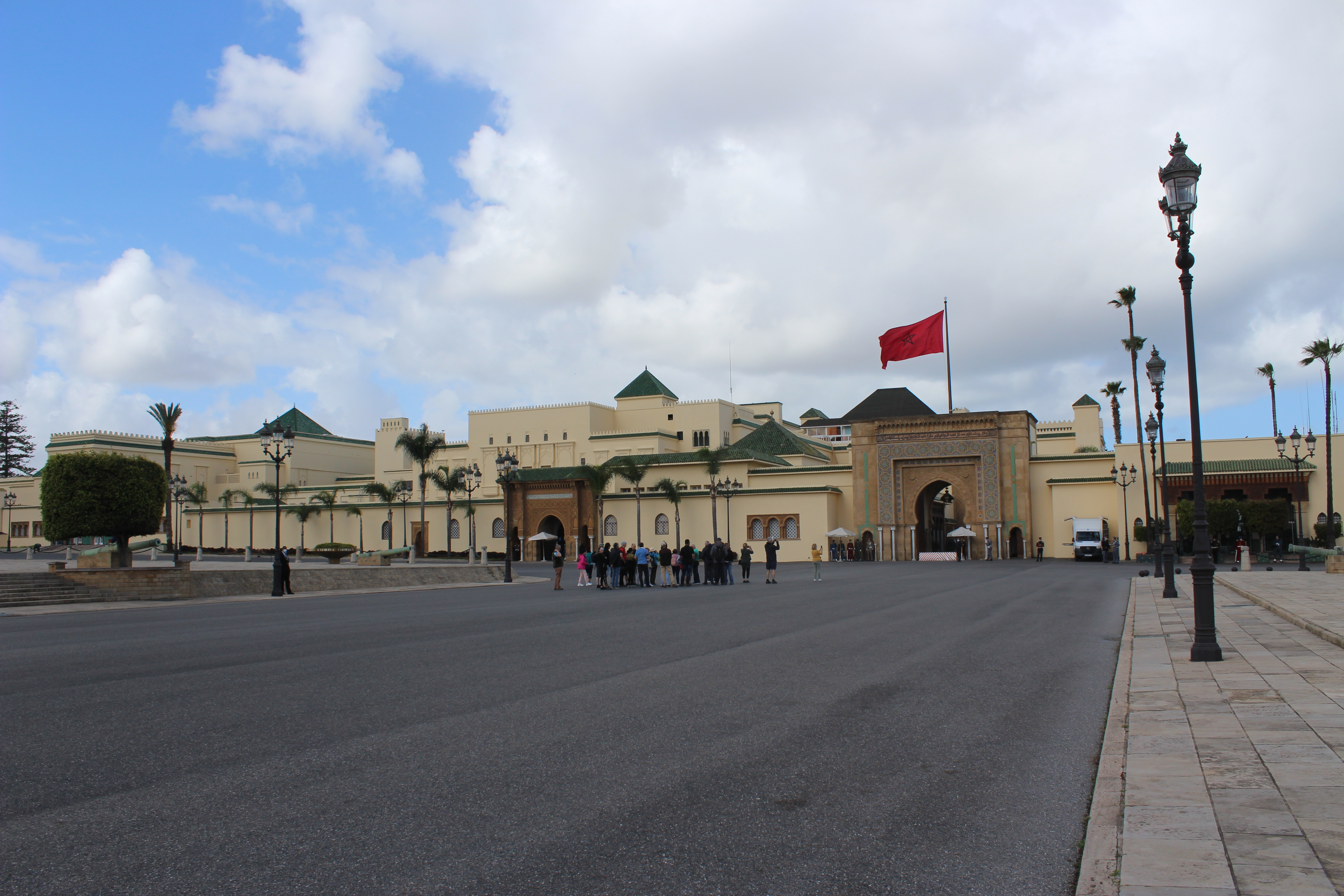
Gates of the Dar al-Makhzen (Royal Palace) today; the palace was begun by the 'Alawi sultans in the late 18th century

During the early part of the 'Alawi period (17th–18th centuries), the sultans took some interest in the city of the south bank and carried out constructions and repairs to the kasbah. Moulay Isma'il (r. 1672–1727) expanded the kasbah southward and built a royal residence within it towards the end of the 17th century (it serves as a museum today). Moulay Isma'il was also responsible for settling a part of the Udayas (or Oudayas), a guich tribe (military tribe serving the sultan's army), in the kasbah to serve as a counterbalancing force against other unruly tribes in the region. Under Sidi Muhammad ibn 'Abdallah (r. 1757–1790), a new royal palace, the Dar al-Makhzen, was established in the southwest part of the Almohad walled area towards the end of the 18th century. These additions began to give the city the character and function of a royal residence used by the ruling dynasty outside their main capitals.

Moulay Slimane (r. 1792–1822) built another palace along the seaside called Dar al-Bahr and built new mosques such as the Moulay Slimane Mosque. He also ordered the creation of a Jewish quarter, the Mellah, in the eastern part of the Andalusian medina, in an area formerly occupied by orchards. It was also towards the beginning of the 19th century that the city walls, formerly limited to the Almohad-era perimeter, were extended significantly to the southwest, thus expanding the city to cover around 840 hectares. The old Almohad walls and gates were still retained and the Almohad-era enclosure remained a more privileged district containing the city's major monuments and its imperial residence. Most of the population remained concentrated in the medina behind the Andalusian Wall in the northern section. In the 1850s, Moulay Abd ar-Rahman (r. 1822–1859) further developed and completed the Dar al-Makhzen palace in the southwest corner of this enclosure. At the end of the 19th century or beginning of the 20th century, the city had some 20,000 to 25,000 inhabitants.

=== 20th century ===
==== French colonial rule ====
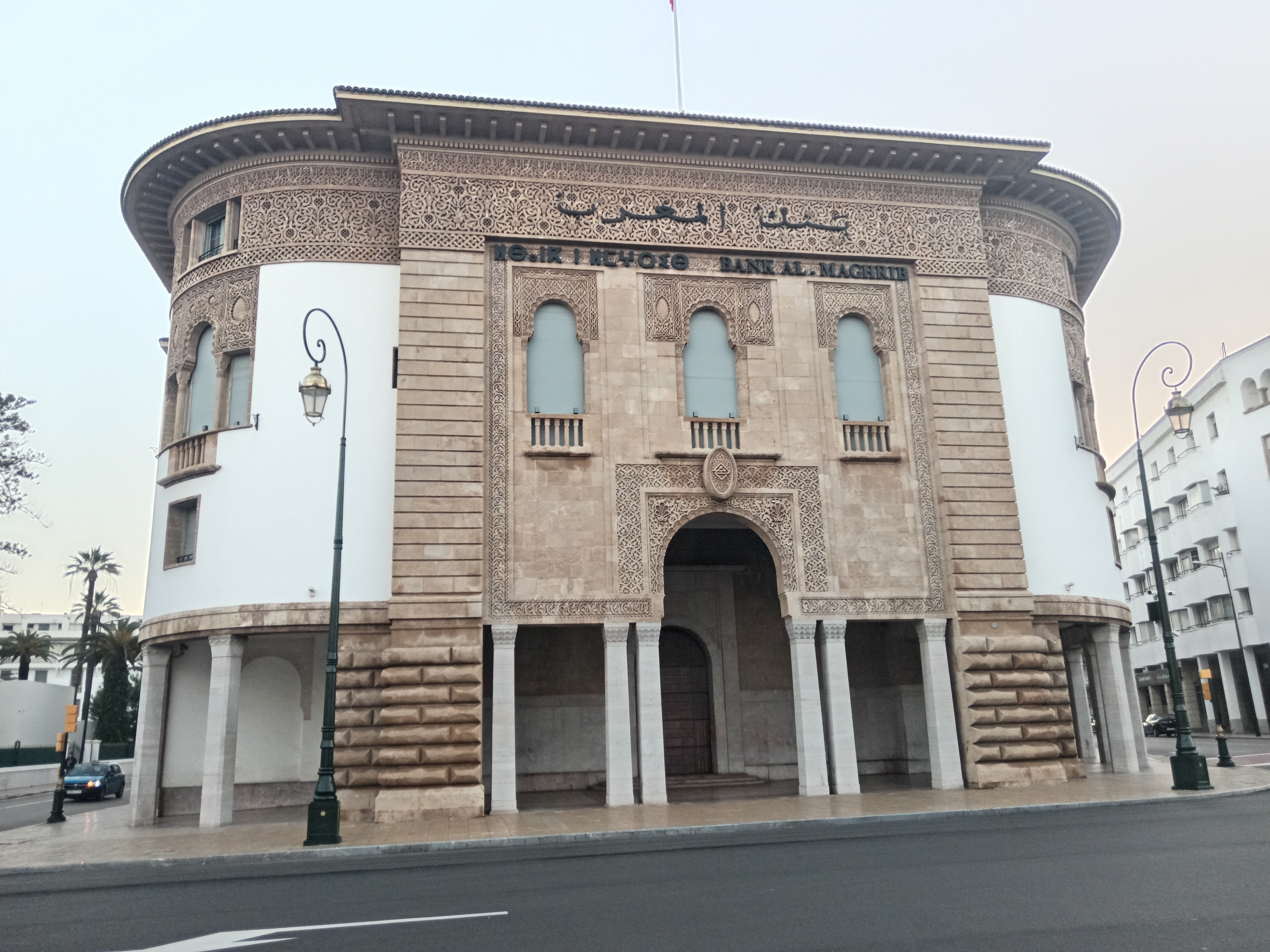
The Bank al-Maghrib building in central Rabat, completed in 1930 under French colonial rule

The French invasion of Morocco began in the east with General Hubert Lyautey's occupation of Oujda in March 1907 and in the west with the Bombardment of Casablanca in August 1907. The Treaty of Fes established the protectorate in March 1912. Acting as French administrator of Morocco, Lyautey decided to relocate the country's capital from Fez to Rabat after the riots of 1912 following the Treaty of Fes. Lyautey appears to have had a personal affinity for Rabat. He argued that its coastal location was more pleasant and more accessible, and that its proximity to Casablanca, which he estimated would become the major economic center, would be advantageous. In 1913, Lyautey hired Henri Prost to design the Ville Nouvelle (Rabat's modern quarter) as an administrative sector, as he did in other major Moroccan cities.

The colonial period resulted in major economic changes as well as accelerated urbanization. Prior to this period, the major cities of Morocco had always been Fez and Marrakesh, while the coastal cities were relatively small. Census figures are not available for the early years of the Protectorate, but in 1912 Rabat and nearby Salé can be estimated to have had about 35,000 to 40,000 inhabitants at most, according to Janet Abu-Lughod. One early French survey, based on the number of houses rather than a formal census, estimated the population of Rabat to be 25,642. A formal census in 1921 counted the population as 33,714. Some of this growth was due to the immigration of foreigners. In 1921, 59% of the population were Moroccan Muslims and 10% were Moroccan Jews, while 21.4% were French nationals and another 10% were foreigners of other origin. Nearby Salé, however, remained more homogenously Moroccan. Rabat's population grew to approximately 83,000 in 1936 and to approximately 156,000 in 1952.

==== Post World War II and independence ====
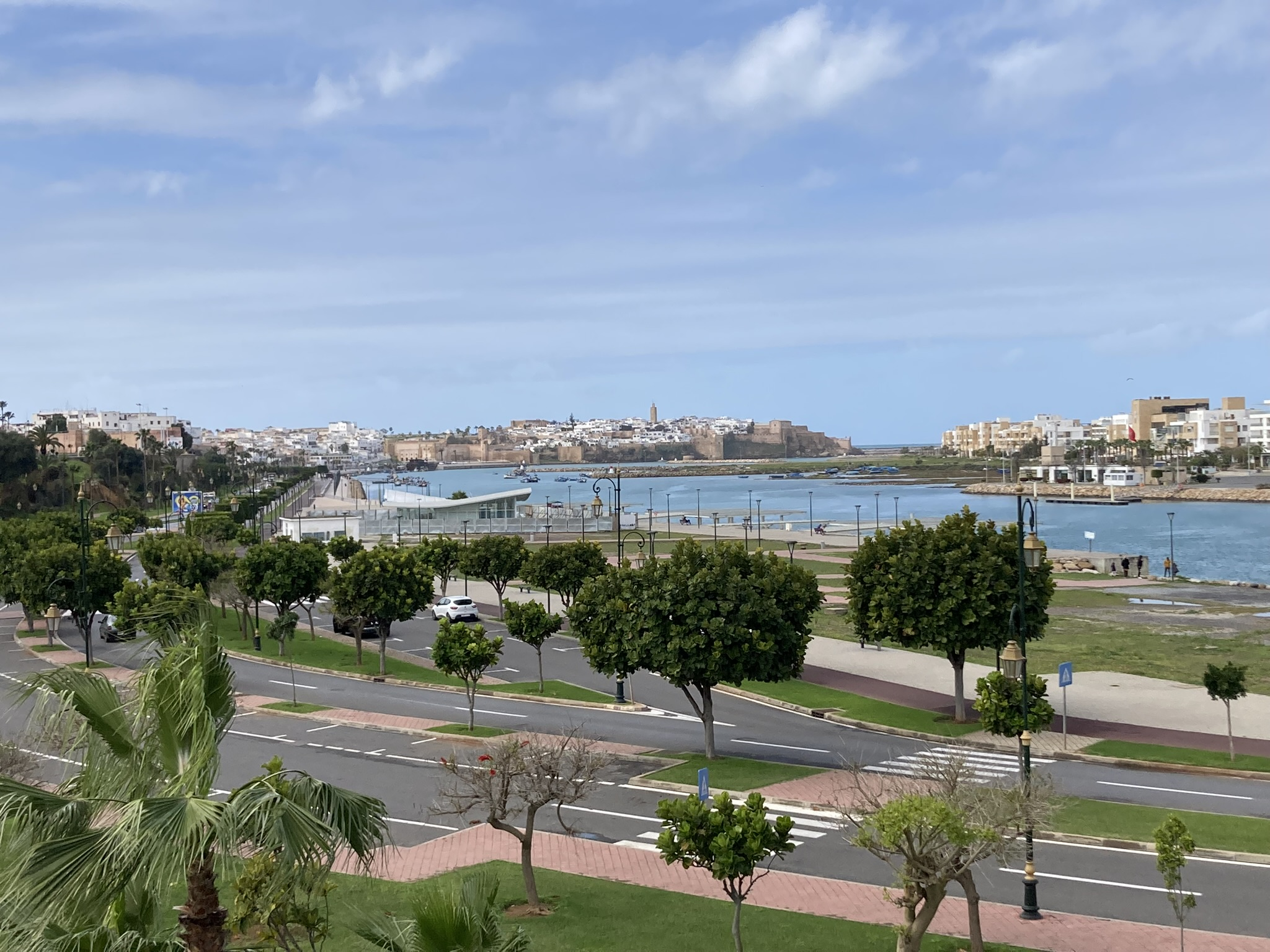
Rabat has served as the legislative, diplomatic, and executive capital of Morocco since 1956

When Morocco achieved independence in 1956, Mohammed V, the then King of Morocco, chose to have the capital remain at Rabat. Rabat's growth continued unabated. The most important demographic shift after independence was the exodus of foreign nationals and their replacement by Moroccans, who gradually took over the jobs and functions that the foreigners had occupied. In the census of 1971, the population of Rabat had grown to around 368,000, of which only 3.5% were foreigners.

Following World War II, the United States had established a military presence in Rabat at the former French air base. By the early 1950s, Rabat Salé Air Base was a U.S. Air Force installation hosting the 17th Air Force and the 5th Air Division, which oversaw forward basing for Strategic Air Command (SAC) B-47 Stratojet aircraft in the country. With the destabilization of French government in Morocco, and Moroccan independence in 1956, the government of Mohammed V wanted the U.S. Air Force to pull out of the SAC bases in Morocco, insisting on such action after American intervention in Lebanon in 1958. The United States agreed to leave as of December 1959, and was fully out of Morocco by 1963. SAC felt the Moroccan bases were much less critical with the long range capability of the B-52 Stratofortresses that were replacing the B-47s and with the completion of the USAF installations in Spain in 1959. With the USAF withdrawal from Rabat-Salé in the 1960s, the facility became a primary facility for the Royal Moroccan Air Force known as Air Base Nº 1, a status it continues to hold.

The fifth Arab League summit took place in Rabat in 1969 to discuss the arson of Al-Aqsa Mosque by Australian citizen Denis Michael Rohan. In the same year, the Organisation of Islamic Cooperation, an organization that aims to protect the interests of the Muslim world, was founded at a summit in Rabat. The 1974 Arab League summit was also held in Rabat. The summit recognized the Palestine Liberation Organization as the sole legitimate representative of the Palestinian people. In 1985, the sixth edition of the Pan Arab Games was held in Rabat.

In 2015, the city became part of the Rabat-Salé-Kénitra administrative region.

== Geography ==
=== Neighbourhoods of Rabat ===
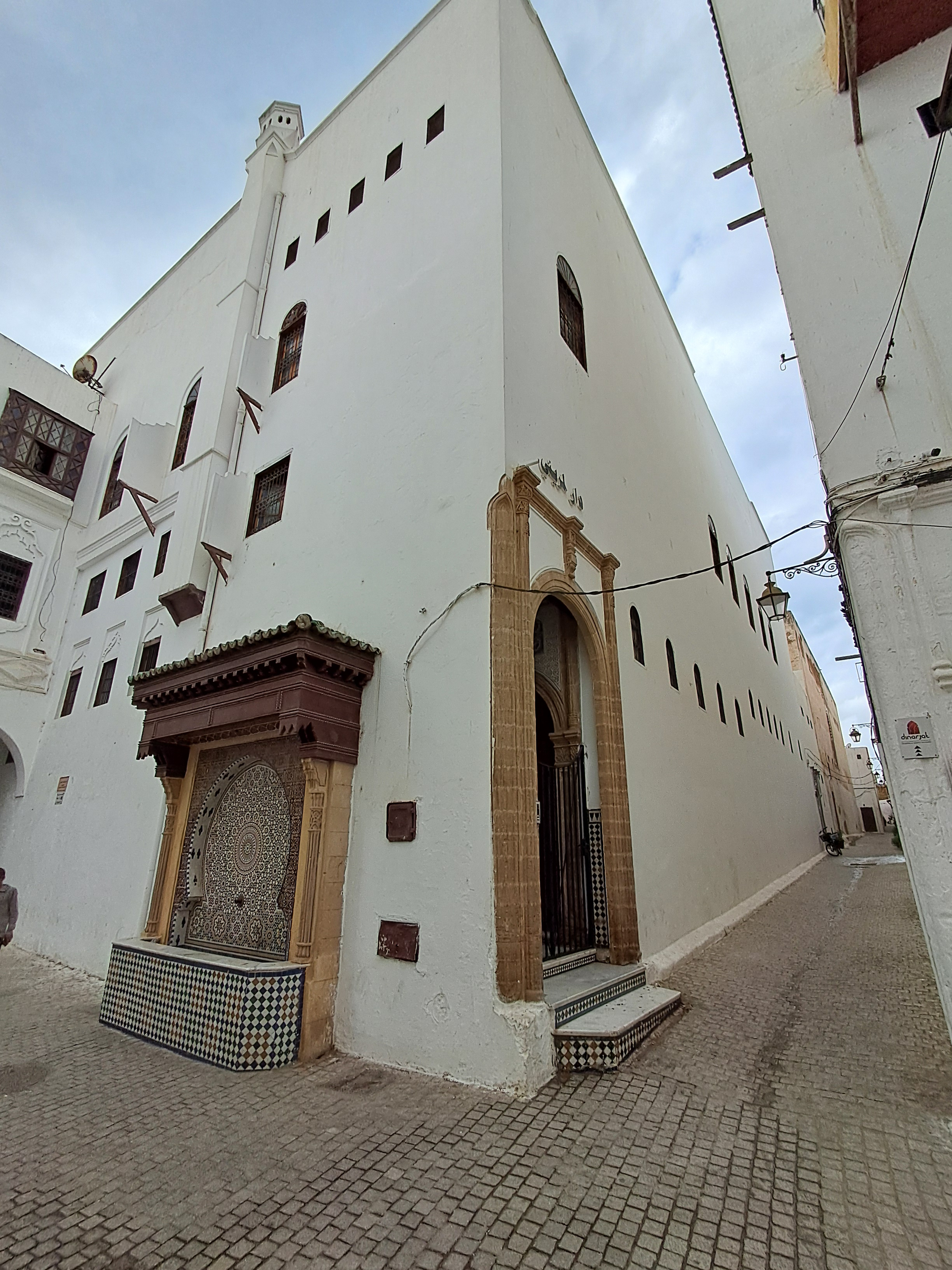
Rabat Medina

Rabat is an administrative city. It has many shopping districts and residential neighbourhoods. The geographically spread out neighbourhoods are as follows:

The heart of the city consists of three parts: the Medina (old town); the Oudayas and Hassan both located to meet the Bou Regreg; and the Atlantic Ocean.

To the west, and along the waterfront, there is a succession of neighbourhoods. First, around the ramparts, there are the old neighbourhoods, Quartier l'Océan and Quartier les Orangers. Beyond that, a succession of mostly working-class districts: Diour Jamaa, Akkari, Yacoub El Mansour, Massira and Hay el Fath are the main parts of this axis. Hay el Fath, which ends this sequence, evolves into a middle-class neighbourhood.

To the east, along the Bou Regreg, the Youssoufia region (working and middle class) : Mabella; Taqaddoum; Hay Nahda (mostly middle class); Aviation (middle and upper middle class); and Rommani.

Between the two axes, from north to south, there are three main neighbourhoods (middle class to affluent): Agdal (Ward Building; a lively mix of residential and commercial buildings. The residents are predominantly upper middle class); Hay Riad (affluent villas; this neighbourhood has experienced a surge of momentum since the 2000s); and Souissi (lavish villas, embassies, well-off residential neighborhood).

On the outskirts of Souissi are a number of less dense regions mainly comprising large private houses to areas that seem out of the city.

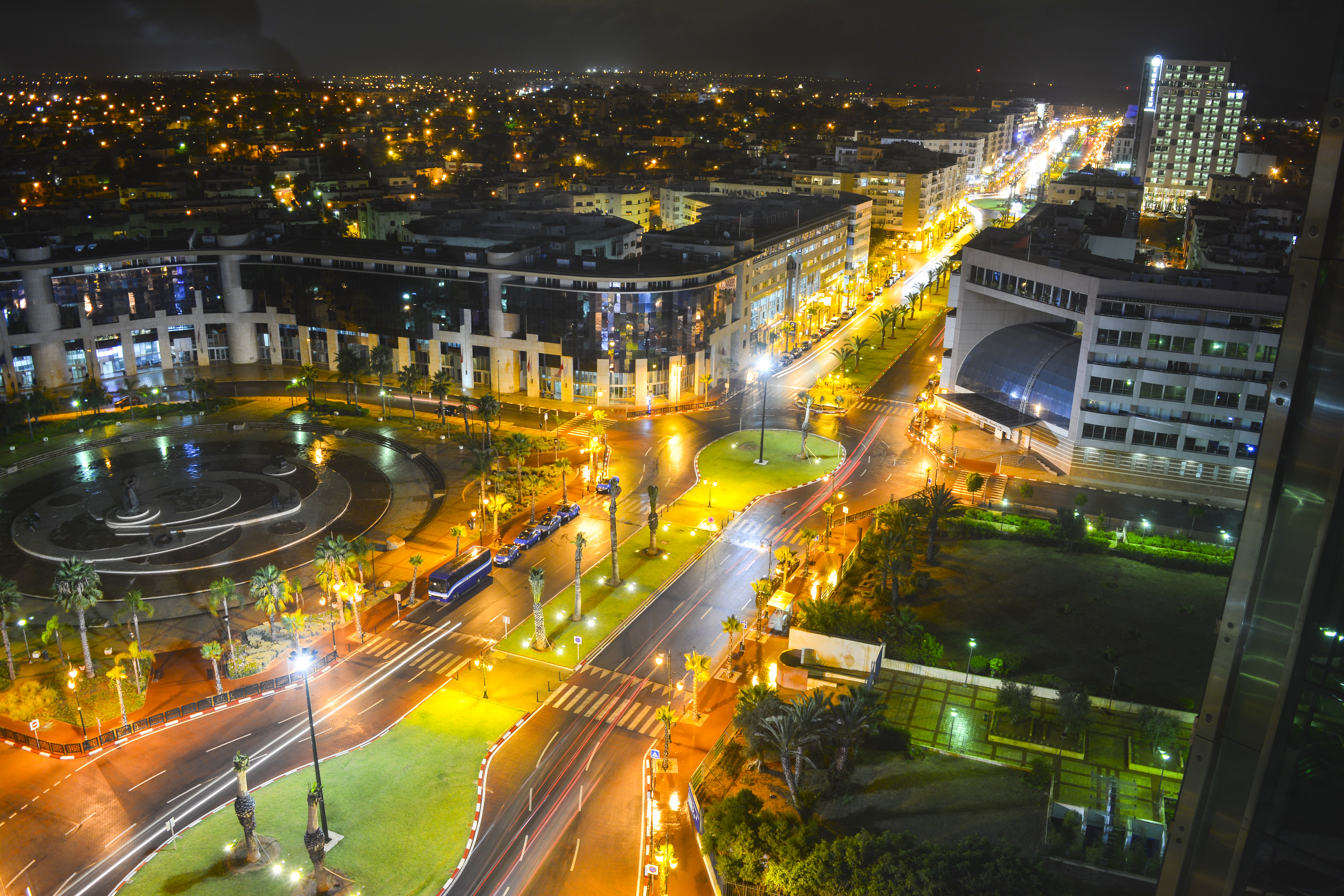
Riad District

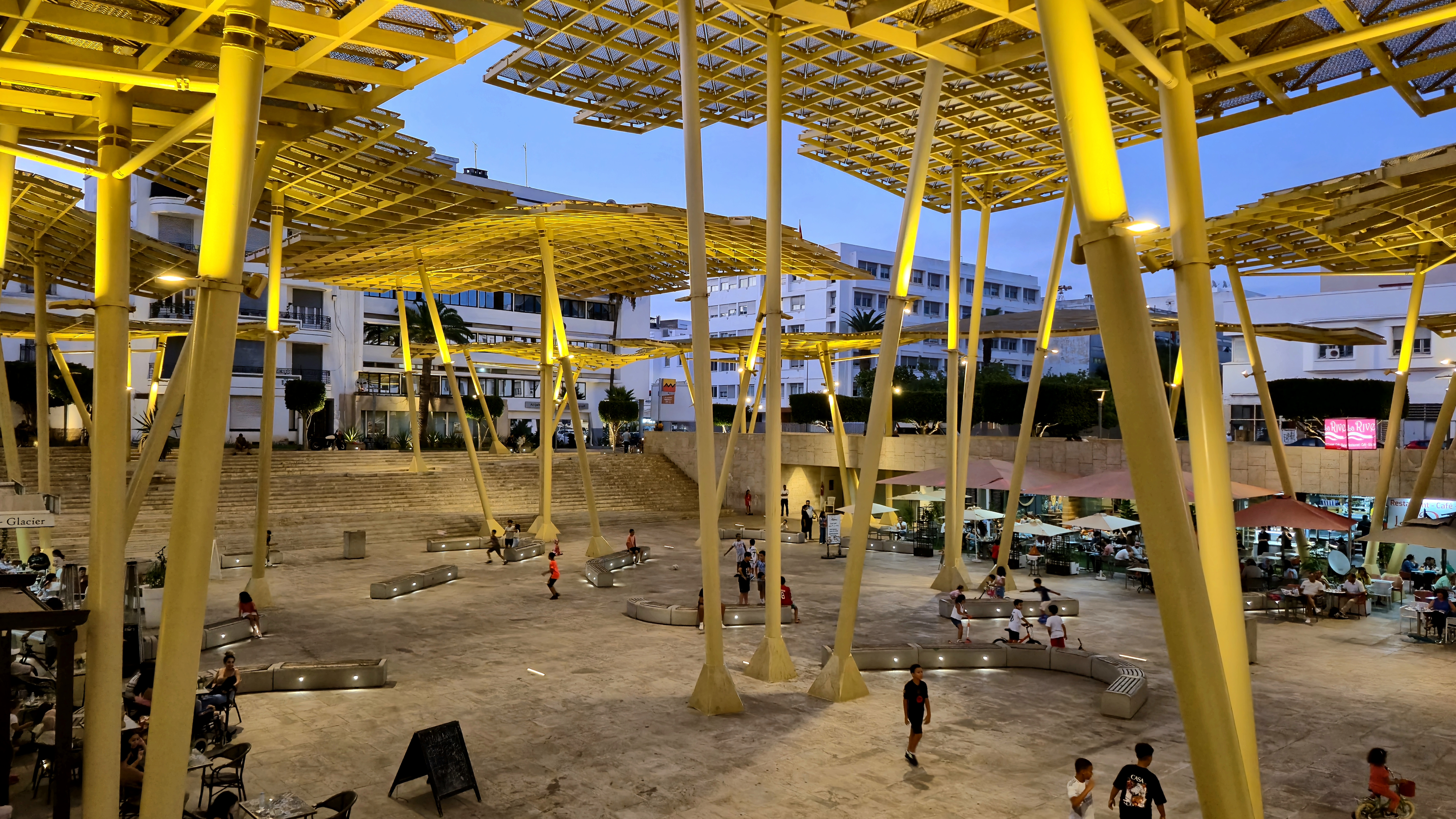
Pietri Square

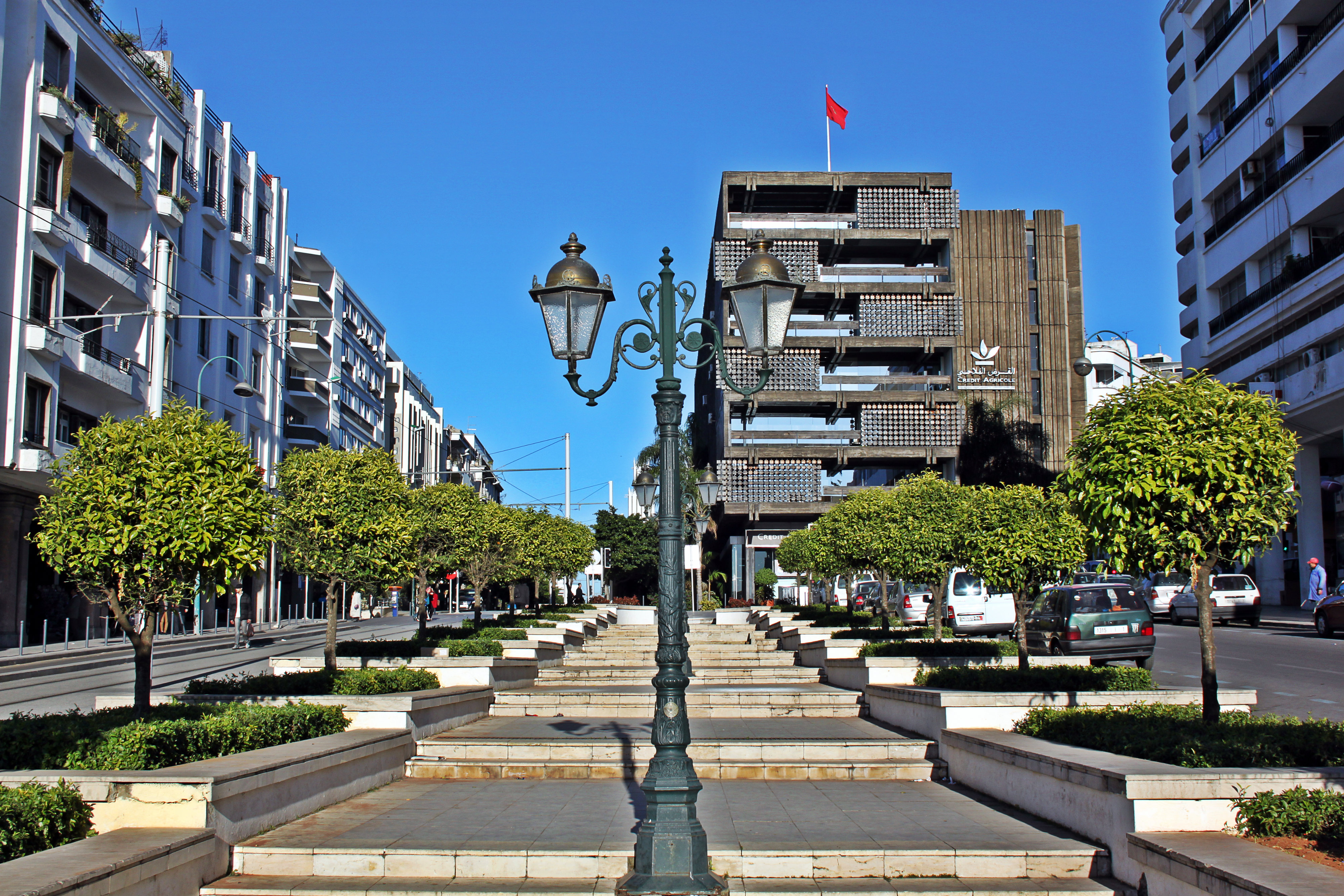
Rabat Hassan

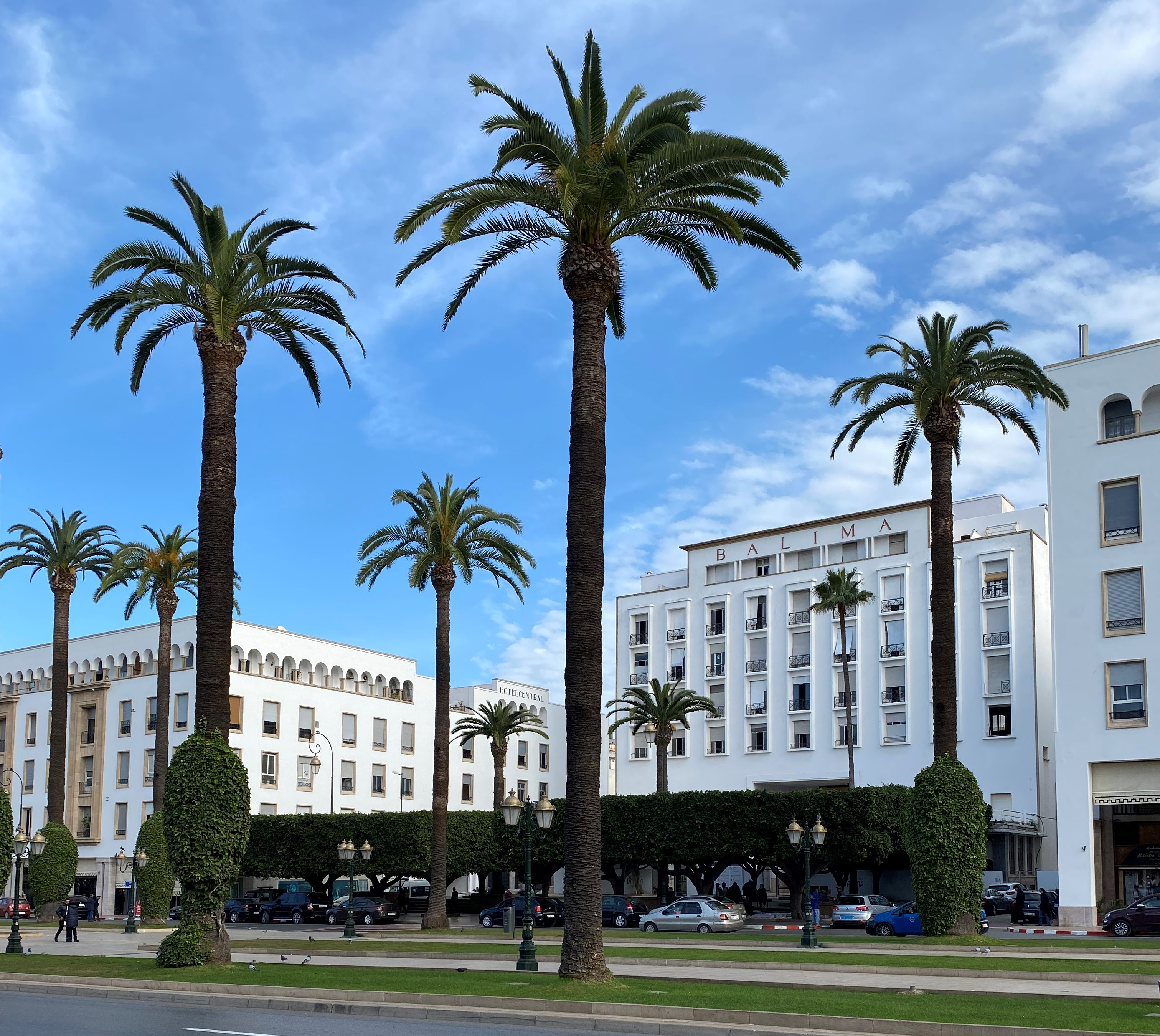
Avenue Mohammed V

=== Subdivisions ===
The 5 arrondissements of Rabat and Touarga

Rabat Commune's council office

The prefecture is divided administratively into the following:

Name	Geographic code	Type	Population (2024)
Agdal Riyad	421.01.01.	Arrondissement	70,435
El Youssoufia	421.01.03.	Arrondissement	157,587
Hassan	421.01.05.	Arrondissement	92,454
Souissi	421.01.06.	Arrondissement	21,049
Touarga	421.01.07.	Municipality	5,703
Yacoub El Mansour	421.01.09.	Arrondissement	168,391

=== Climate ===
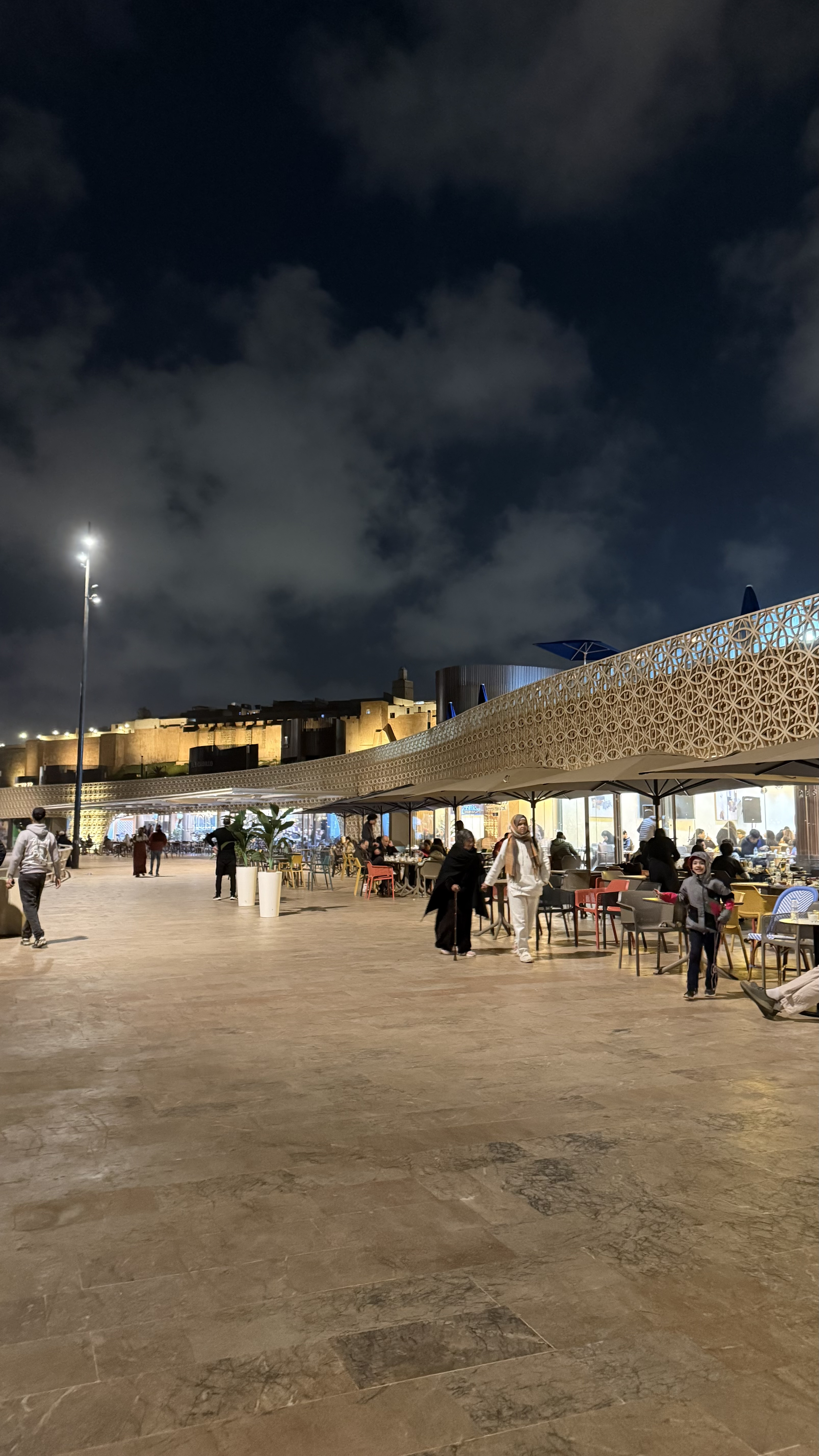
Rabat Marina.

Rabat features a hot-summer Mediterranean climate (Csa) with warm to hot, dry summers and mild, damp winters. Located along the Atlantic Ocean, Rabat has a mild, temperate climate, shifting from cool in winter to warm days in the summer months.

The nights are always cool (or cold in winter, it can reach sub 0 °C (32 °F) sometimes), with daytime temperatures generally rising about 7–8 °C (13–14 °F).

The winter highs typically reach only 17.2 °C (63.0 °F) in December–February. Summer daytime highs usually hover around 27 °C (80.6 °F), but may occasionally exceed 40 °C (104.0 °F) during heat waves.

Summer nights are usually pleasant and cool, ranging between 11 and 19 °C (51.8 and 66.2 °F) and rarely exceeding 20 °C (68.0 °F). Rabat belongs to the sub-humid bioclimatic zone with an average annual precipitation of 560 mm (22 in).

The airport station is located about 5 kilometres (3.1 mi) from the coastline, which will somewhat warm afternoons and cool nights down compared to a seaside location :

Climate data for Rabat (Rabat–Salé Airport) 1991–2020, extremes 1943–present
Month	Jan	Feb	Mar	Apr	May	Jun	Jul	Aug	Sep	Oct	Nov	Dec	Year
Record high °C (°F)	30.0 (86.0)	33.9 (93.0)	35.8 (96.4)	37.6 (99.7)	43.0 (109.4)	46.3 (115.3)	47.2 (117.0)	45.8 (114.4)	43.6 (110.5)	38.7 (101.7)	35.1 (95.2)	30.4 (86.7)	47.2 (117.0)
Mean maximum °C (°F)	22.7 (72.9)	23.8 (74.8)	28.6 (83.5)	29.6 (85.3)	33.8 (92.8)	34.5 (94.1)	36.3 (97.3)	35.2 (95.4)	33.7 (92.7)	31.6 (88.9)	27.8 (82.0)	23.7 (74.7)	40.5 (104.9)
Mean daily maximum °C (°F)	17.4 (63.3)	18.2 (64.8)	20.2 (68.4)	21.2 (70.2)	23.6 (74.5)	25.6 (78.1)	27.2 (81.0)	27.8 (82.0)	26.6 (79.9)	24.8 (76.6)	21.1 (70.0)	18.6 (65.5)	22.7 (72.9)
Daily mean °C (°F)	12.3 (54.1)	13.0 (55.4)	14.8 (58.6)	16.0 (60.8)	18.5 (65.3)	20.8 (69.4)	22.6 (72.7)	23.1 (73.6)	21.7 (71.1)	19.6 (67.3)	15.9 (60.6)	13.7 (56.7)	17.7 (63.9)
Mean daily minimum °C (°F)	7.2 (45.0)	7.8 (46.0)	9.5 (49.1)	10.9 (51.6)	13.3 (55.9)	15.9 (60.6)	17.9 (64.2)	18.3 (64.9)	16.8 (62.2)	14.4 (57.9)	10.8 (51.4)	8.8 (47.8)	12.6 (54.7)
Mean minimum °C (°F)	2.7 (36.9)	3.1 (37.6)	4.4 (39.9)	6.5 (43.7)	8.5 (47.3)	11.5 (52.7)	13.6 (56.5)	14.2 (57.6)	12.8 (55.0)	10.1 (50.2)	5.7 (42.3)	3.9 (39.0)	1.5 (34.7)
Record low °C (°F)	−3.2 (26.2)	−2.6 (27.3)	−1.0 (30.2)	3.8 (38.8)	5.3 (41.5)	8.2 (46.8)	10.0 (50.0)	11.0 (51.8)	10.0 (50.0)	5.8 (42.4)	0.3 (32.5)	−0.6 (30.9)	−3.2 (26.2)
Average precipitation mm (inches)	80.9 (3.19)	60.5 (2.38)	62.6 (2.46)	42.3 (1.67)	17.9 (0.70)	3.6 (0.14)	0.4 (0.02)	0.6 (0.02)	13.7 (0.54)	54.9 (2.16)	94.3 (3.71)	90.2 (3.55)	521.9 (20.55)
Average precipitation days (≥ 1.0 mm)	7.6	6.4	6.4	5.3	2.7	0.8	0.2	0.3	1.9	5.2	7.4	7.6	51.8
Average relative humidity (%)	82	82	80	78	77	78	78	79	80	79	80	83	80
Mean monthly sunshine hours	192.2	193.2	248.0	270.0	310.0	312.0	337.9	328.6	279.0	251.1	204.0	195.3	3,131.3
Percentage possible sunshine	60.8	62.7	66.7	69.2	71.4	71.2	76.2	78.5	75.0	71.7	66.0	63.0	69.0
Source 1: NOAA (sun 1961–1990)
Source 2: Deutscher Wetterdienst (humidity 1973–1993, record highs and lows), Meteo Climat (record highs and lows) Infoclimat

== Culture ==
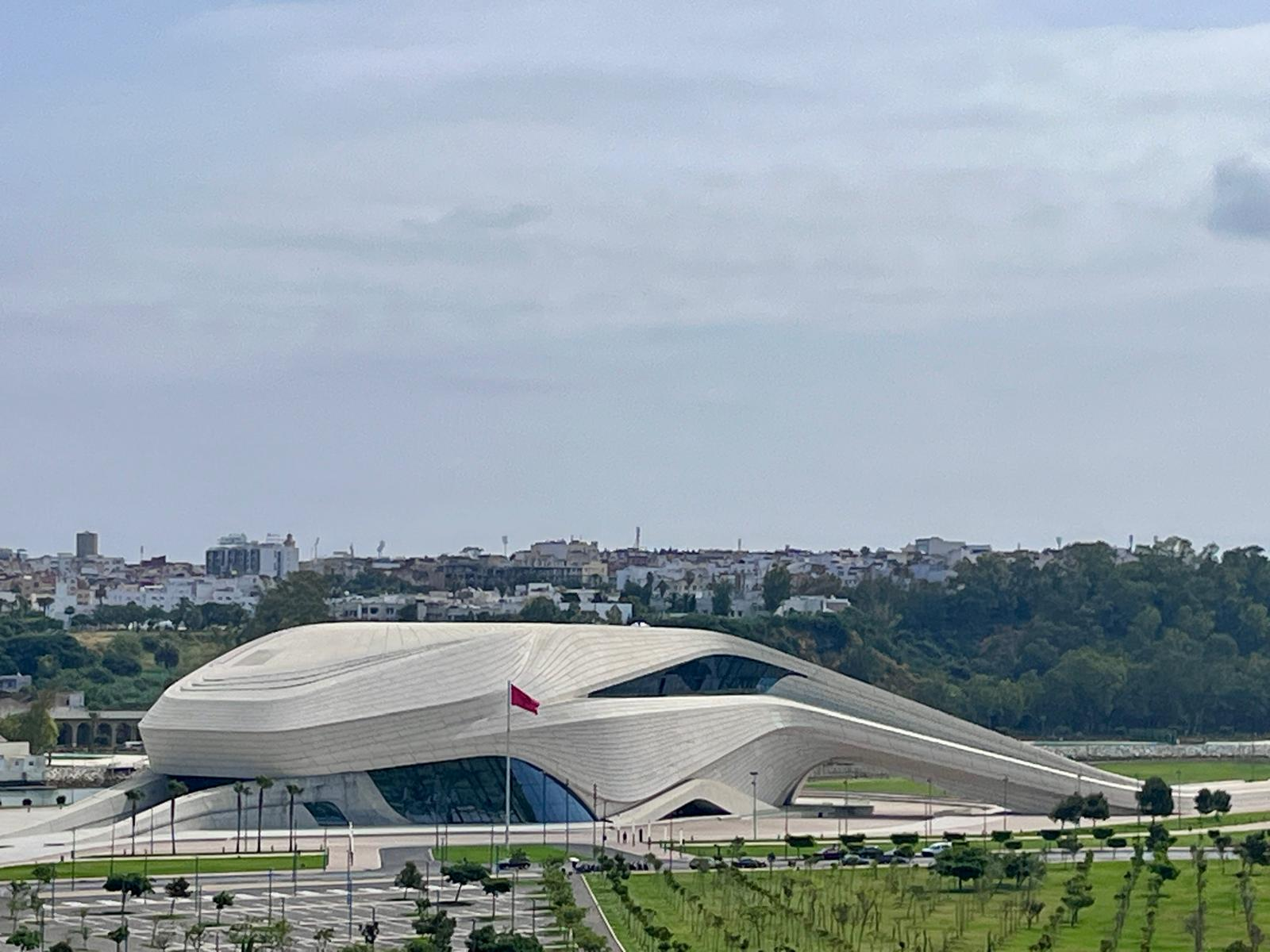
Grand Theatre of Rabat

The biggest place for theatre was the Mohammed V Theatre in the centre of the town, which was opened in 1962. Construction on a new performing arts center, the Grand Theatre of Rabat, began in 2014. Designed by Zaha Hadid, it would reportedly be the largest theater in the Arab world and in Africa. Construction was completed in 2021, and it was opened on the 22nd of April 2026.

Many organizations are active in cultural and social issues. Orient-Occident Foundation and ONA Foundation are the biggest of these. An independent art scene is active in the city. L'appartement 22, which is the first independent space for visual arts created by Abdellah Karroum, opened in 2002 and introduced international and local artists. Other independent spaces opened few years after, such as Le Cube, also set up in a private space.

=== Mawazine ===
Boudchart concert at Mawazine 2026

Mawazine is a music festival in Rabat organized under the auspices of King Mohammed VI of Morocco. The festival was first held in 2001, with music groups, fans and spectators coming together in a week-long celebration of culture and music both locally and internationally. Musicians such as Scorpions, The Weeknd, Jennifer Lopez, Kanye West, Pitbull, Rihanna, Elton John, Stromae and many others have performed at the festival.

Mawazine was host to more than 2,500,000 people in 2013. Workshops are available for teaching dances and other arts. The festival is free. However, while most areas are free, there are those that require payment, specifically the smaller stages being the historical site of Chellah, the Mohammed V National Theater, and the Renaissance Cultural Center.

=== Places of worship ===
The places of worship are predominantly Muslim mosques. The oldest mosque in the city is the "Old Mosque" (Jama' al-'Atiqa) in the Kasbah of the Udayas. It was originally founded during Abd al-Mu'min's construction of the kasbah in 1150, though its current form mostly dates from an 18th-century restoration. Other important mosques include the Great Mosque in the old medina, also known as the el-Kharrazin Mosque, and the As-Sunna Mosque in central Rabat, originally completed in 1785 by Sultan Muhammad ibn Abdallah.

The last remaining synagogues in Rabat are the Rabbi Shalom Zaoui synagogue and the Talmud Torah Synagogue. There are also Christian churches and temples, including an Evangelical church and St. Peter's Cathedral (Cathédrale de Saint-Pierre), which hosts the Roman Catholic Archdiocese of Rabat.

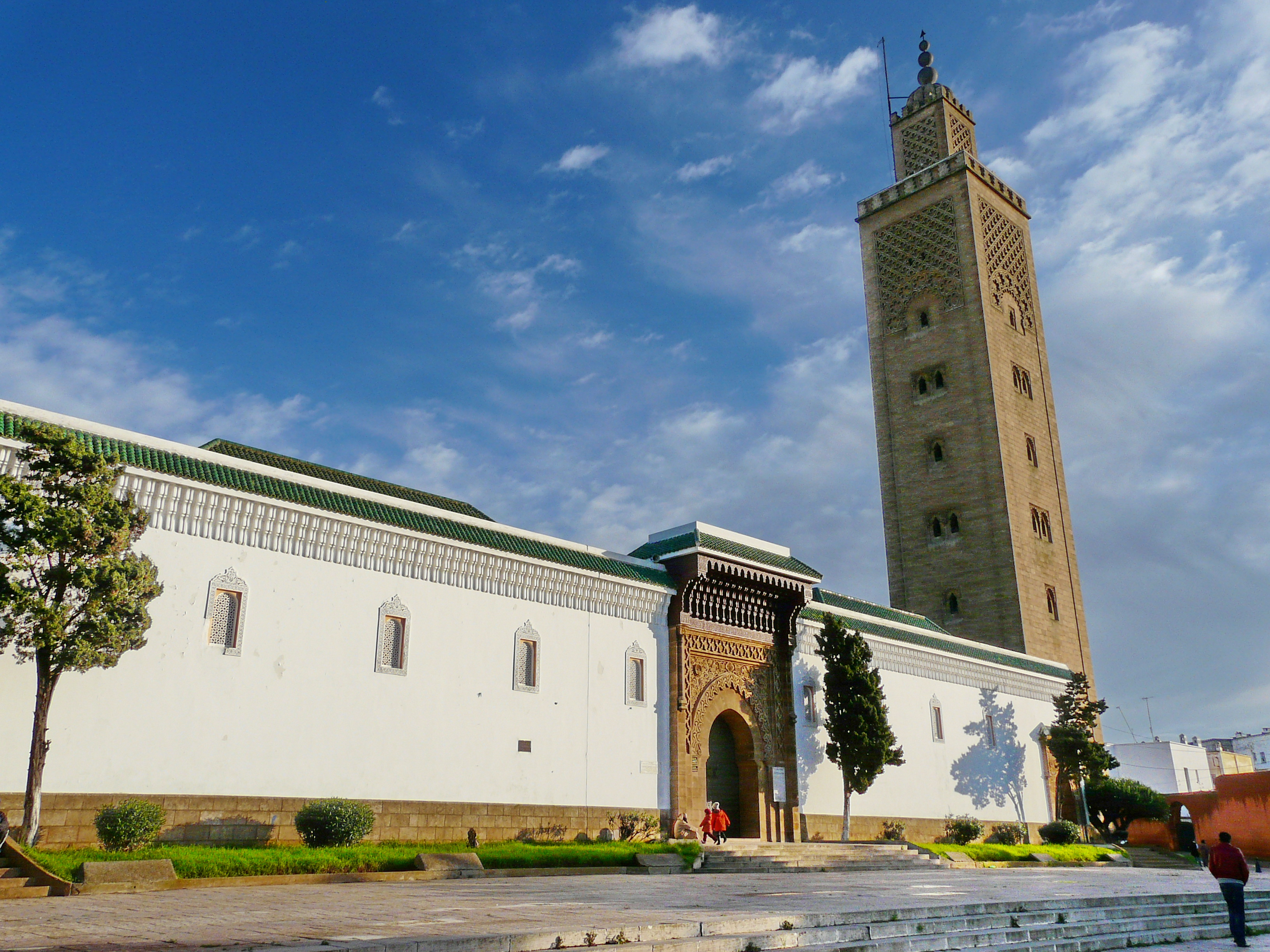
Sunnah Mosque, built in 1785 under Sultan Muhammad III

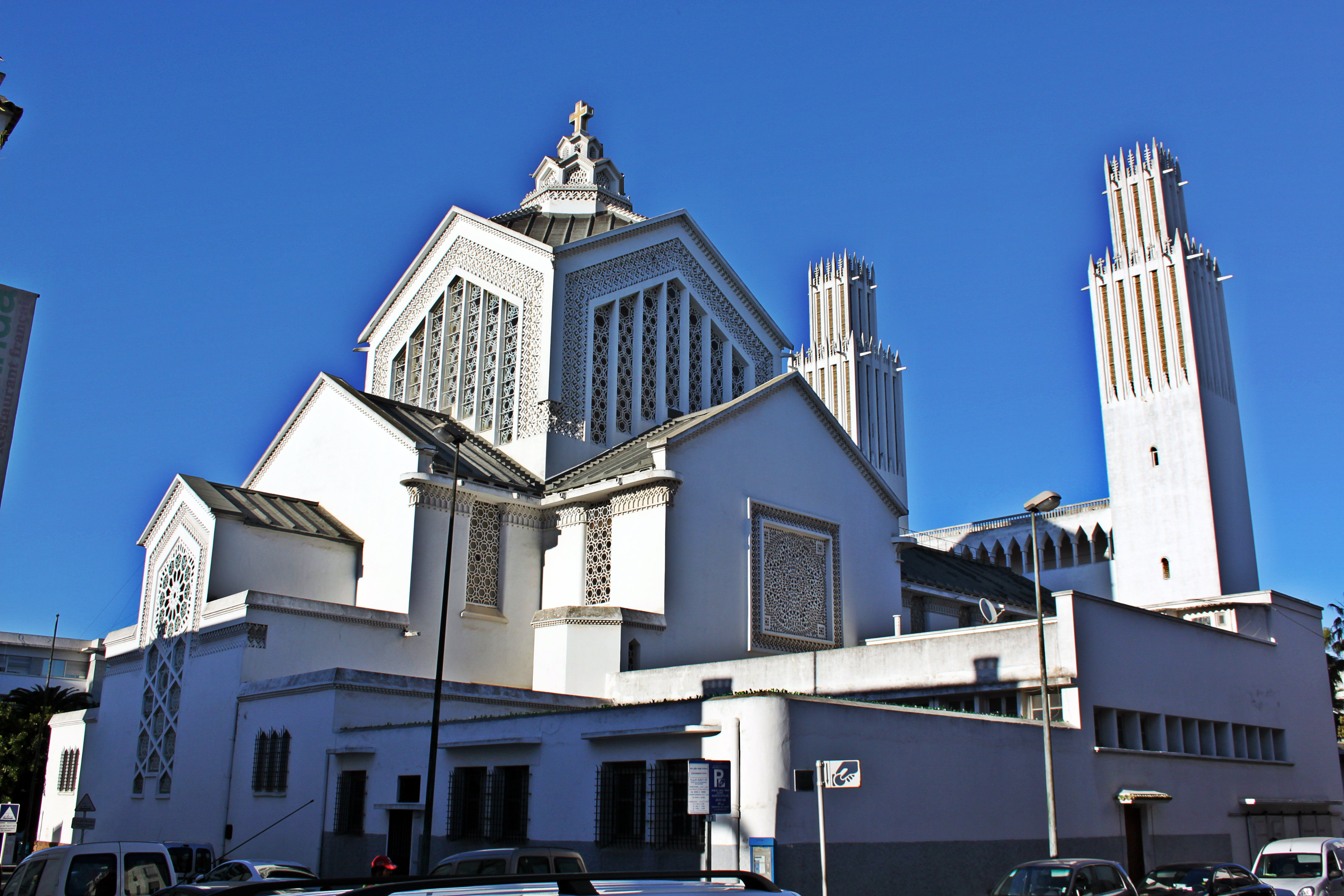
Saint-Pierre Cathedral

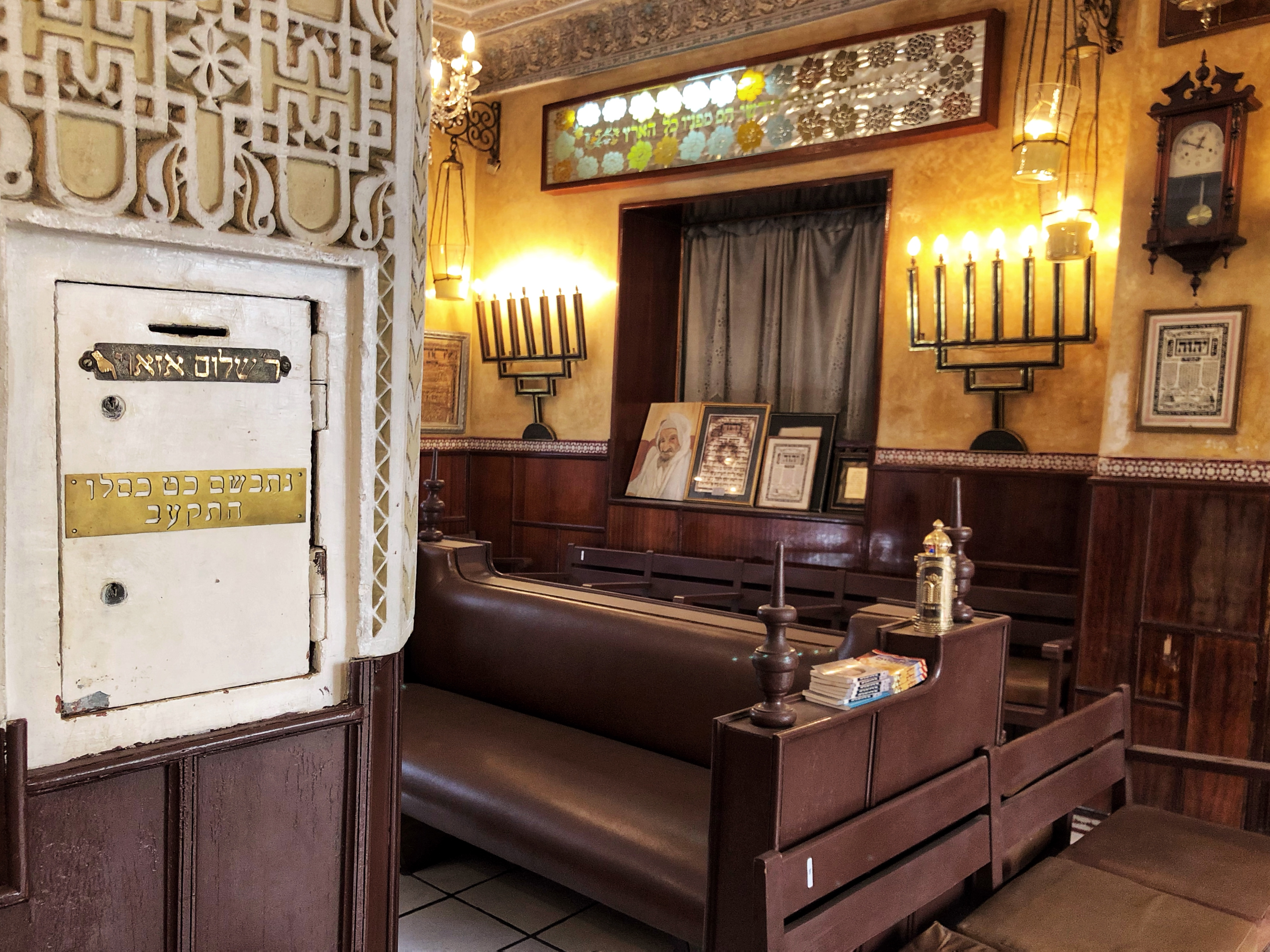
Rabbi Shalom Zaoui synagogue

=== Museums and parks ===
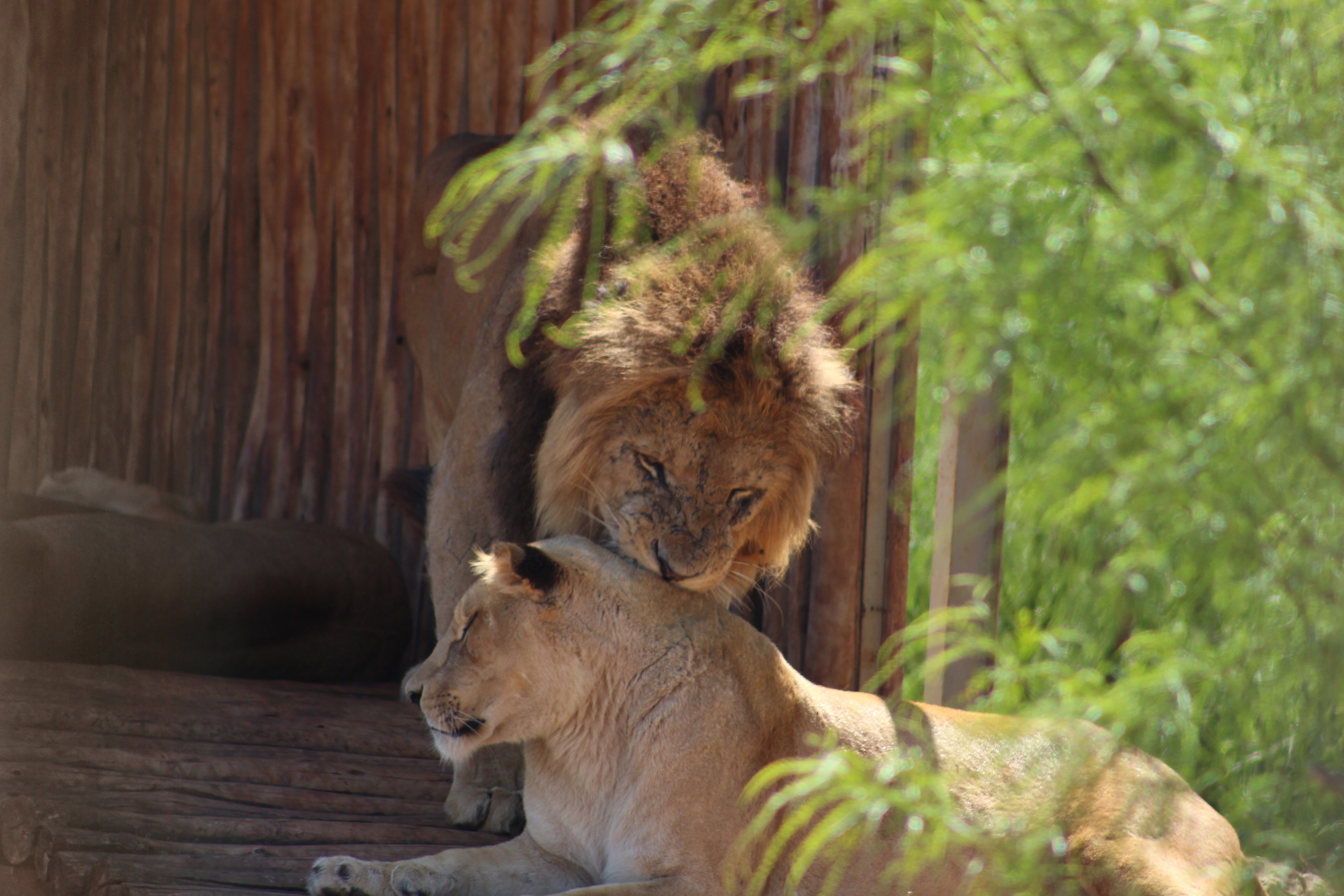
Lions (possible descendants of Barbary lions) at the Rabat Zoo

Bronze bust of king Juba II of Mauretania, Museum of History and Civilizations

The Oudayas Museum (also formerly known as the National Museum of Jewellery) is housed in a pavilion residence built by Sultan Moulay Isma'il (r. 1672–1727) inside the Kasbah of the Udayas. It was first opened in 1915, making it one of the oldest public museums in Morocco. Its collections, augmented by private donations, feature diverse objects from throughout Morocco, mostly from the 18th to 20th centuries. In 2006 it became the National Museum of Jewellery, with exhibits focusing on the history of Moroccan jewellery. As of 2019 it was under renovations to be transformed into a new museum to be called Musée du caftan et de la parure ('Museum of the caftan and adornment').

The Museum of History and Civilizations (formerly the National Archeological Museum) showcases the history of Morocco through a collection of archeological artifacts from the Punic, Mauretanian, Roman, and Islamic periods. This includes a collection of ancient Roman bronze and marble statuary from sites such as Lixus, Volubilis, and Chellah, as well as coins, ceramics, and architectural fragments from the Islamic period.

The Rabat Zoo (officially called the Zoological Garden of Rabat) was opened in 1973, in part to house the lions that were previously kept at the Royal Palace. The lions are descended from the now-extinct Barbary lions. Since then the zoo has expanded to house some 1800 animals and has engaged in conservation efforts.

The Bank al-Maghrib Museum was inaugurated in 2002 and is housed at the Bank al-Maghrib building downtown. Its main exhibits include a collection of coins and currency from ancient times to the modern era, as well as a gallery of Orientialist art. The Mohammed VI Museum of Modern and Contemporary Art was inaugurated in 2014.

=== Historic monuments ===
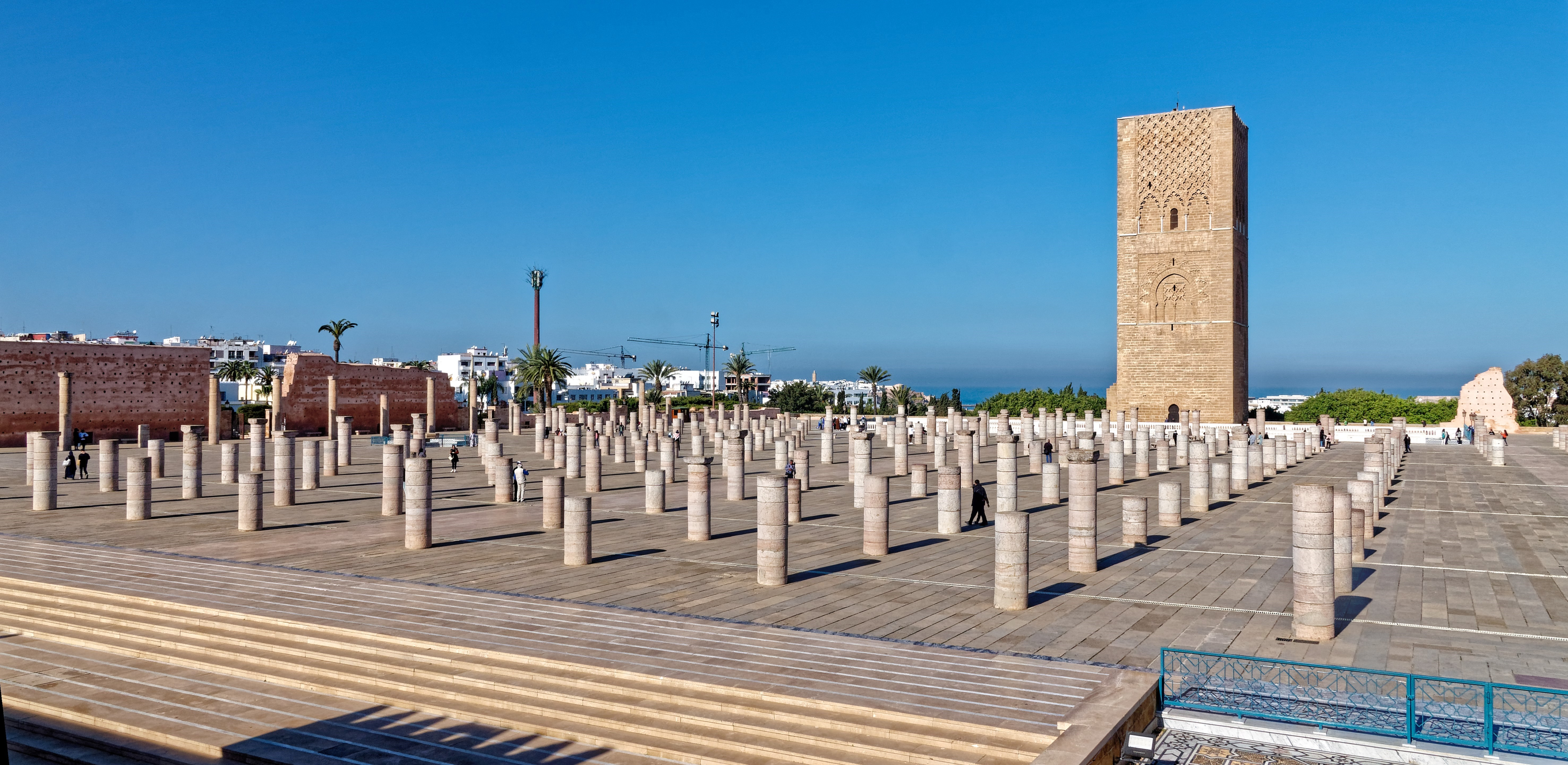
Hassan Tower

Roman Ruins at Chellah

The Kasbah of the Udayas (also spelled "Kasbah of the Oudaias") is the oldest part of the present-day city, built by the Almohads in the 12th century. It was later refortified and expanded by the corsairs and the 'Alawi dynasty in the 17th and 18th centuries. The kasbah is now a residential district with traditional houses painted white and blue on the outside. Its southern section includes the "Andalusian Garden", landscaped in the 20th century.

The city's historic walls were first built by the Almohad caliph Ya'qub al-Mansur and completed in 1197, with later additions in the 17th and 19th centuries. A number of monumental gates are found along the walls, the most notable being Bab er-Rouah. The other Almohad-era gates are Bab el-Had, Bab al-Alou, Bab Zaers, and Bab al-Hadid, though many of them were modified in more recent periods. The 17th-century Andalusian Wall, which divides the zone inside the Almohad walls, has five more gates: Bab Jdid (formerly Bab Teben, mostly demolished), Bab al-Bouiba, Bab Chellah, Bab Mellah, and Bab Diouana.

The old medina, located below the kasbah and above the line of the Andalusian Wall, contains many historic mosques and traditional houses. The rest of the area within the Almohad walls but south of the Andalusian Wall was largely built up in the 20th century when Rabat became the capital during the French Protectorate. These districts contain numerous public buildings and apartment blocs built in contemporary styles of that period, such as neo-Moorish (known as néo-Mauresque or arabisant in French), Art Nouveau, Art Deco, and modern architecture. Examples of these include the Bank al-Maghrib building (built in the 1920s), the Central Post Office building (circa 1921, expanded in 1930s), the Parliament building (built in the 1920s), St.-Peter's Cathedral (inaugurated in 1921, with later additions), the Rabat-Ville train station (early 1920s), and some of the apartment blocs on Rue Gaza (built or begun in the 1930s), among others.

Overlooking the shores of the river is the Hassan Tower, a monumental unfinished minaret constructed by Ya'qub al-Mansur in the late 12th century. It was built for an enormous mosque planned as part of the larger city al-Mansur was constructing. Across from the tower today, at the southern end of the mosque's remains, is the Mausoleum of Mohammed V (d. 1961), which houses the remains of King Mohammed V and King Hassan II. The mausoleum, completed in 1971, was designed in a neo-Moorish or Moroccan revivalist style by Vietnamese architect Cong Vo Toan.

A short distance south of the historic city walls is the archeological site of Chellah, a walled enclosure containing a 13th to 14th-century Marinid funerary and religious complex as well as the ruins of the Roman city of Sala Colonia. Across the river is the city of Salé, which also preserves a historic medina. The medina of Salé includes monuments from the Marinid period such as Bab Mrissa and the Madrasa of Abu al-Hasan as well as landmarks from later periods.

Historic sites and landmarks

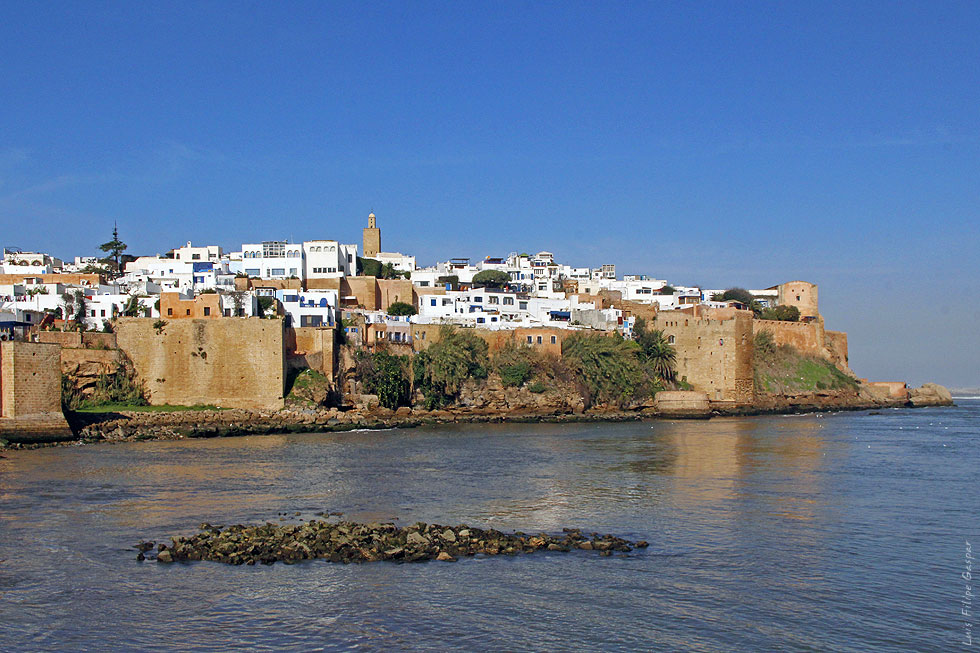
The Kasbah of the Udayas, seen from the river

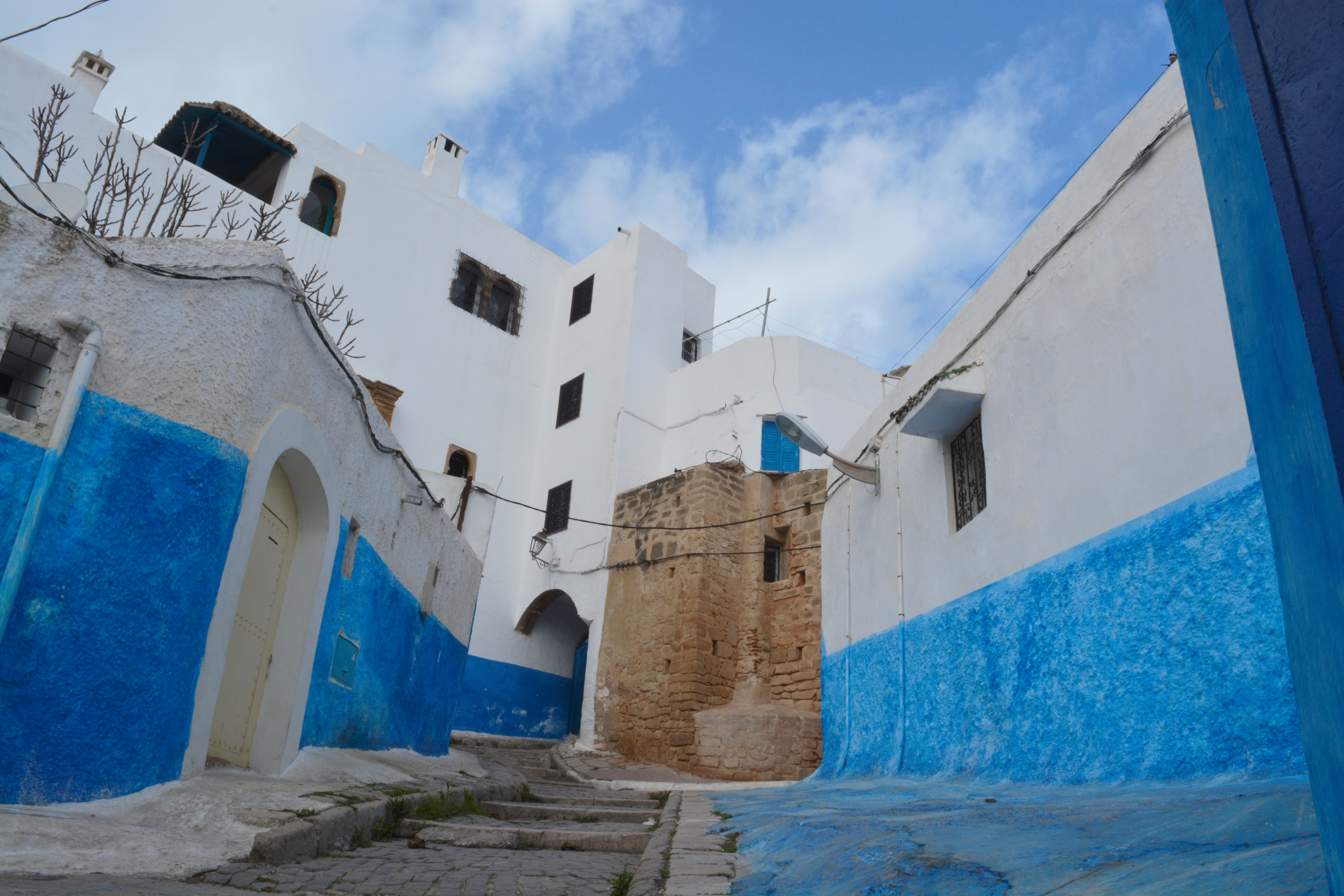
Typical street and houses inside the Kasbah

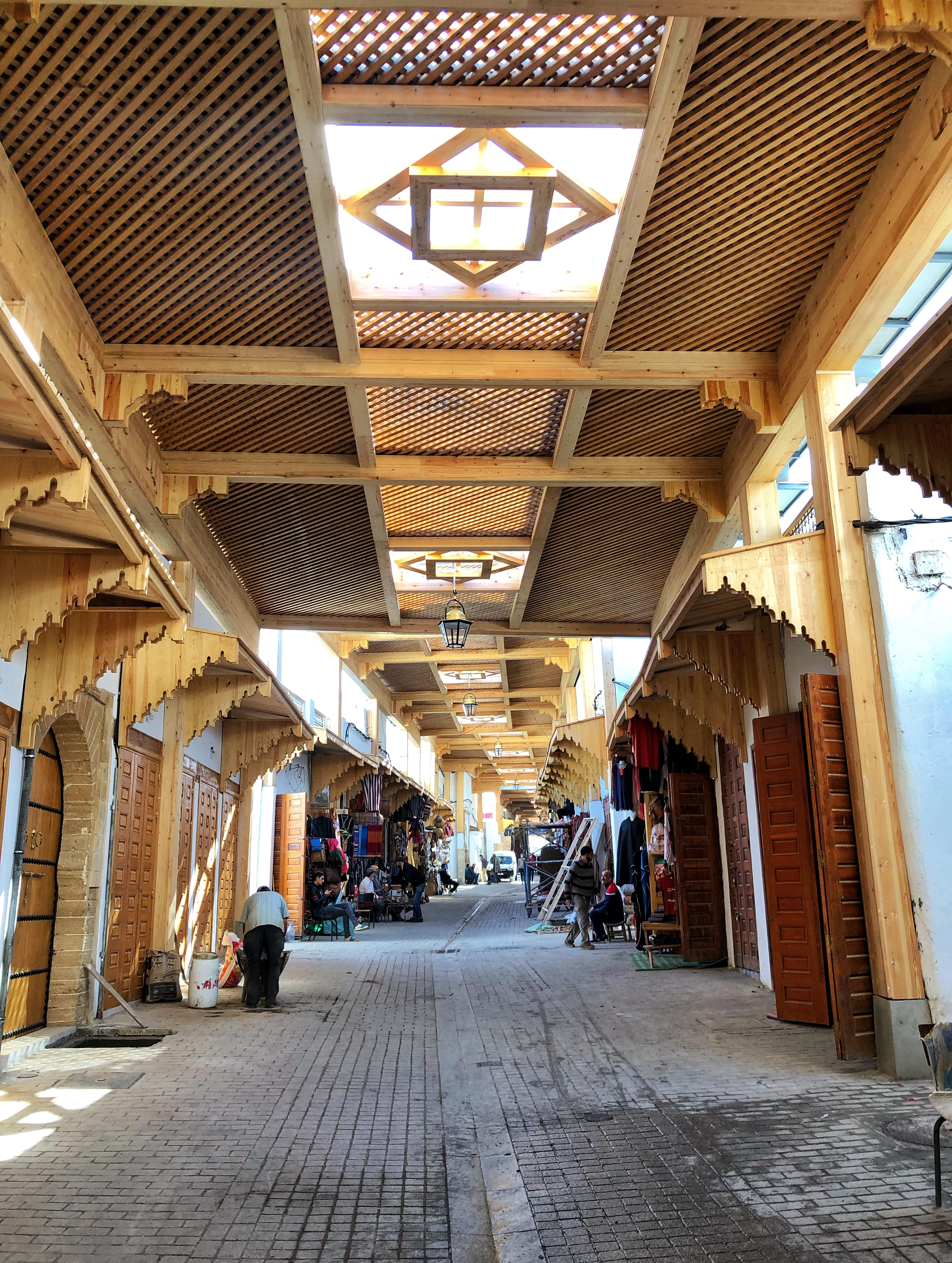
Rue des Consuls, one of the main streets of the medina

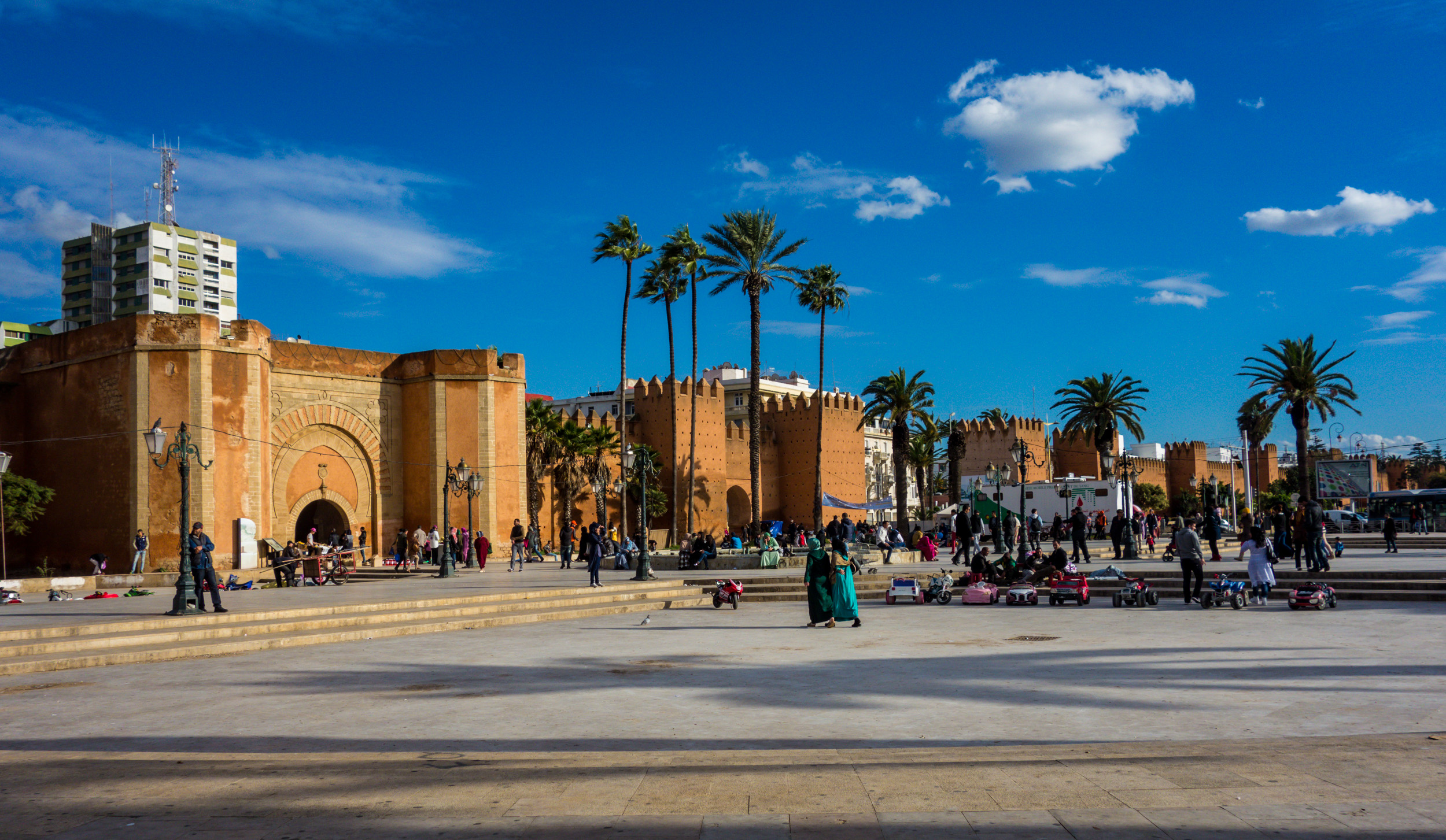
City walls, including Bab al-Had (left)

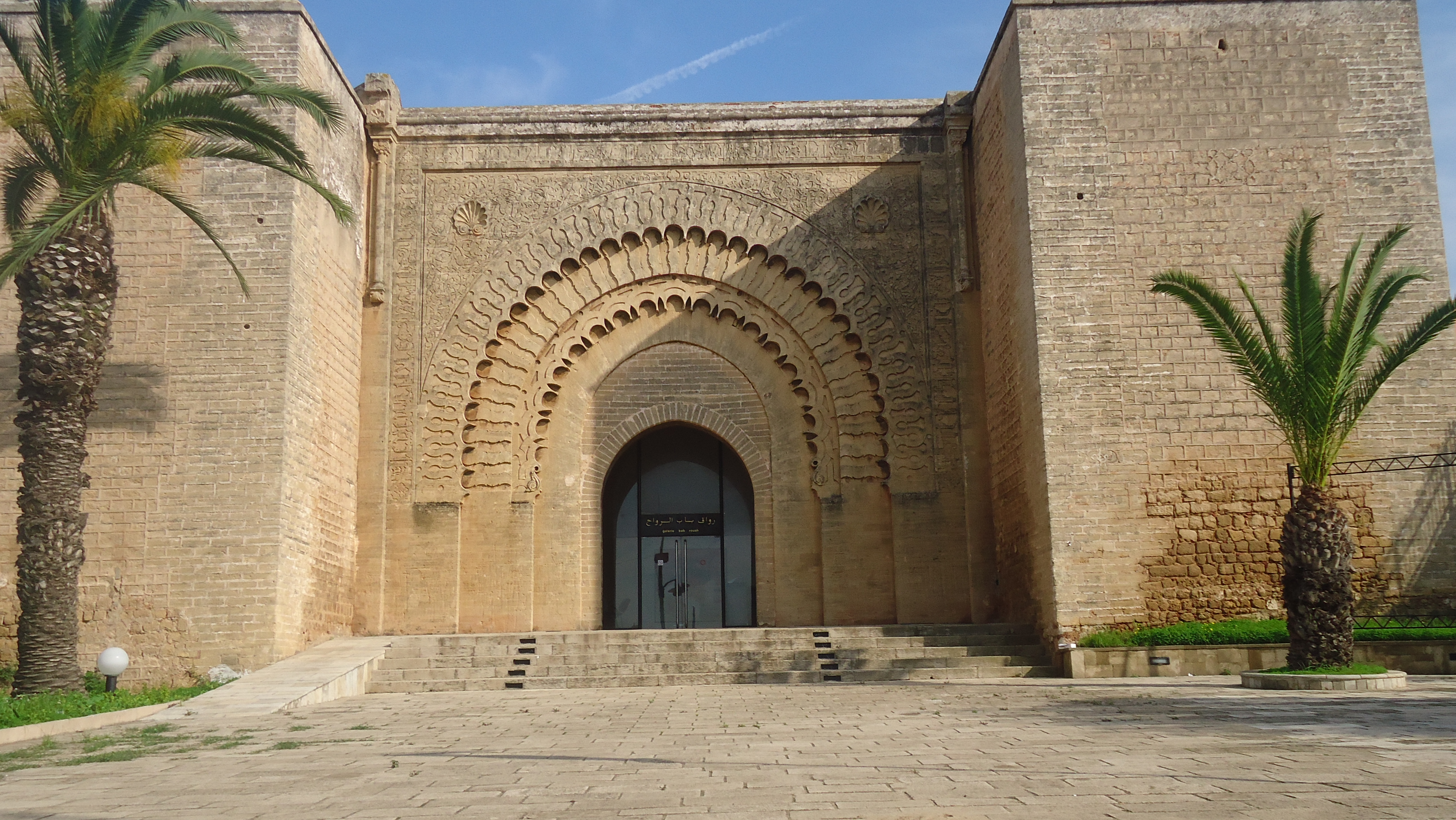
Bab ar-Rouah

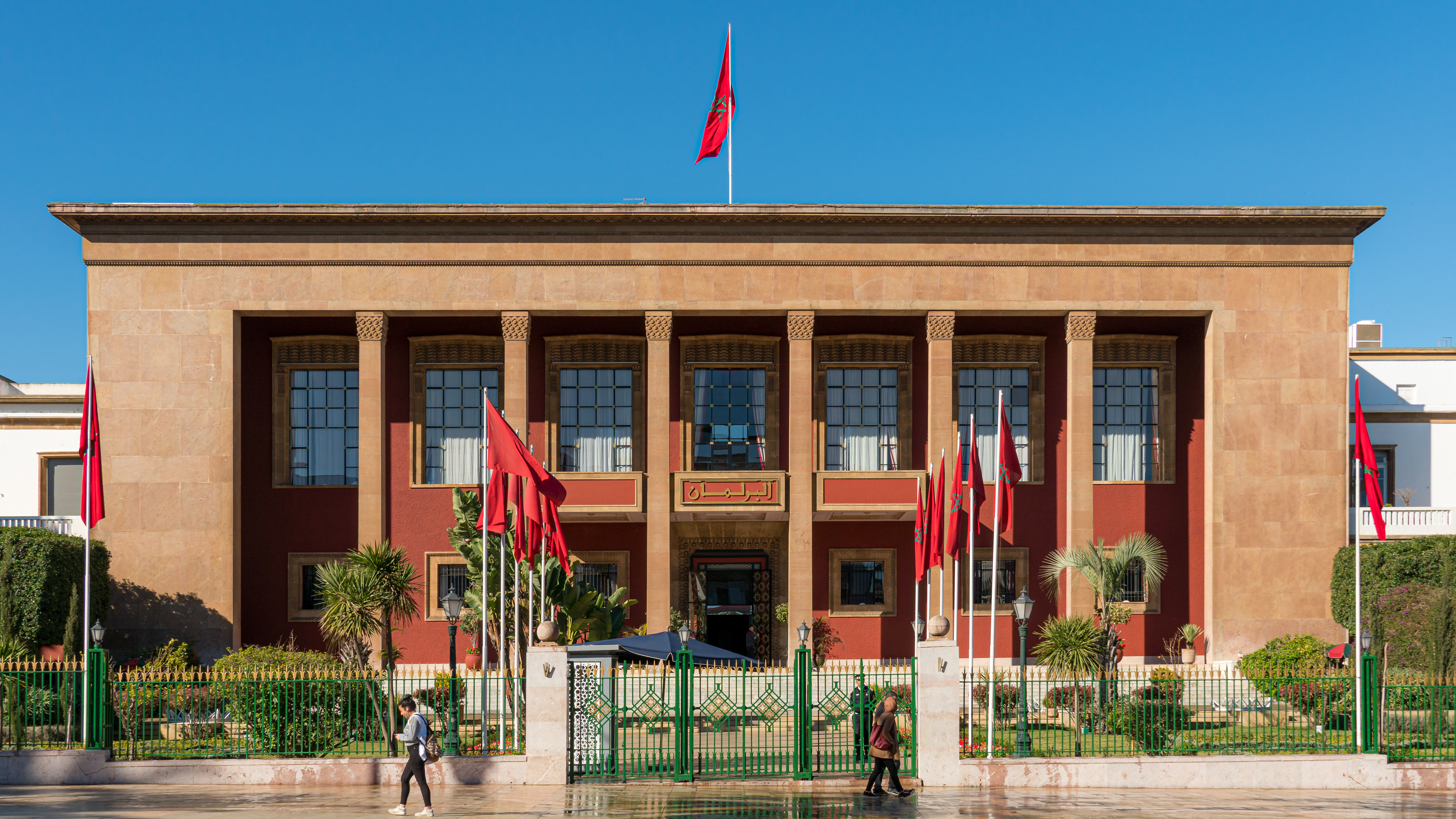
Parliament of Morocco

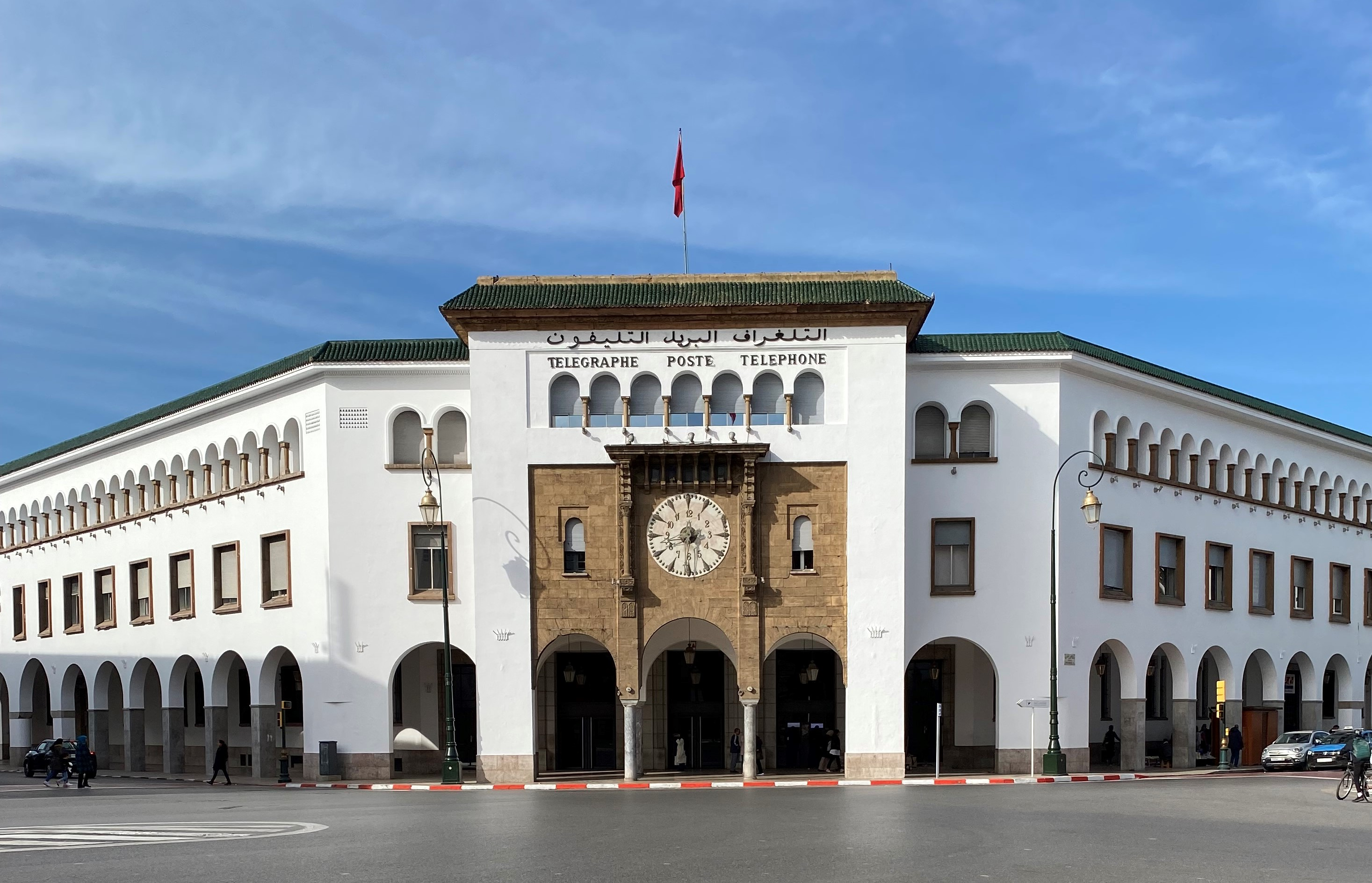
Central Post Office

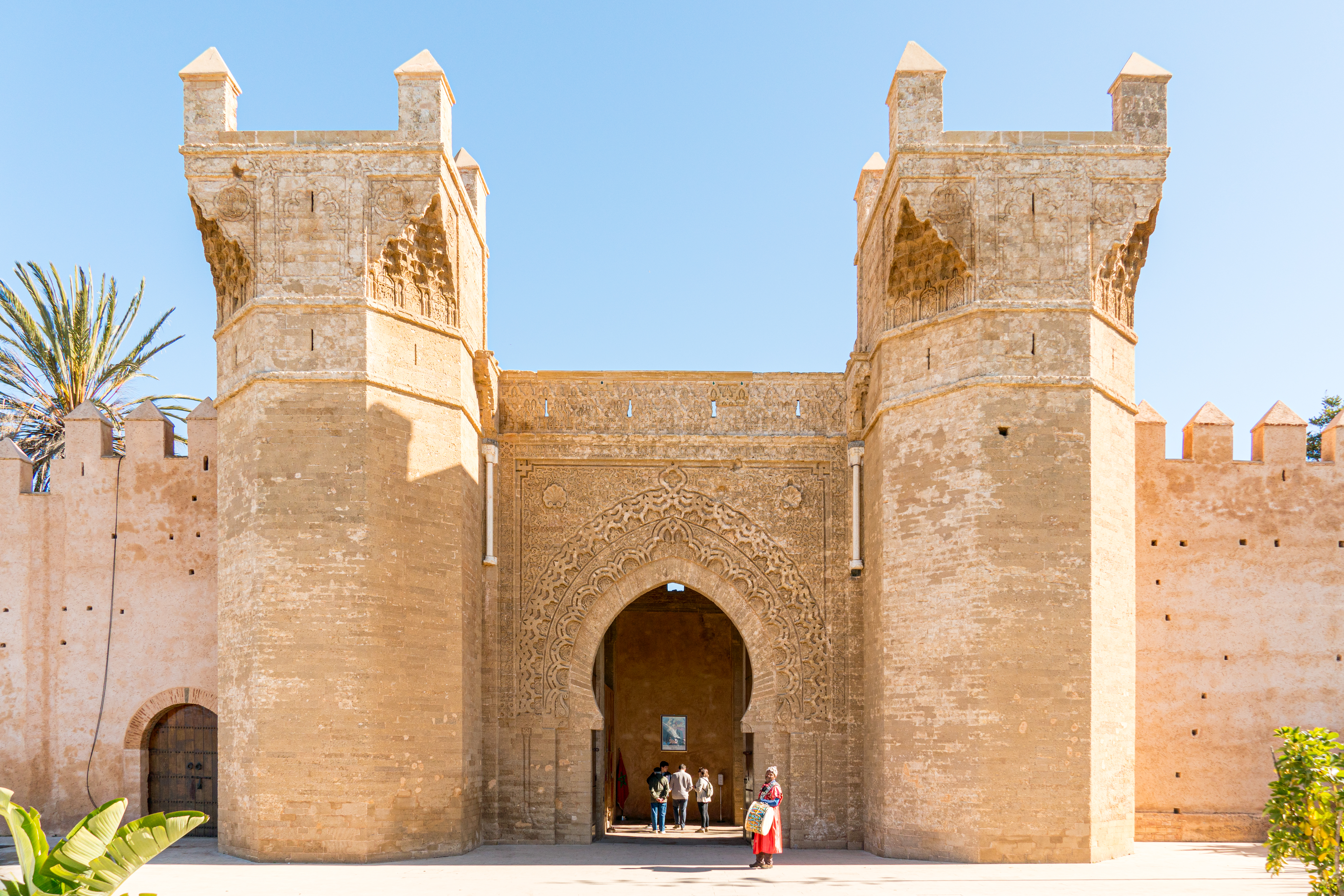
Gates of Chellah

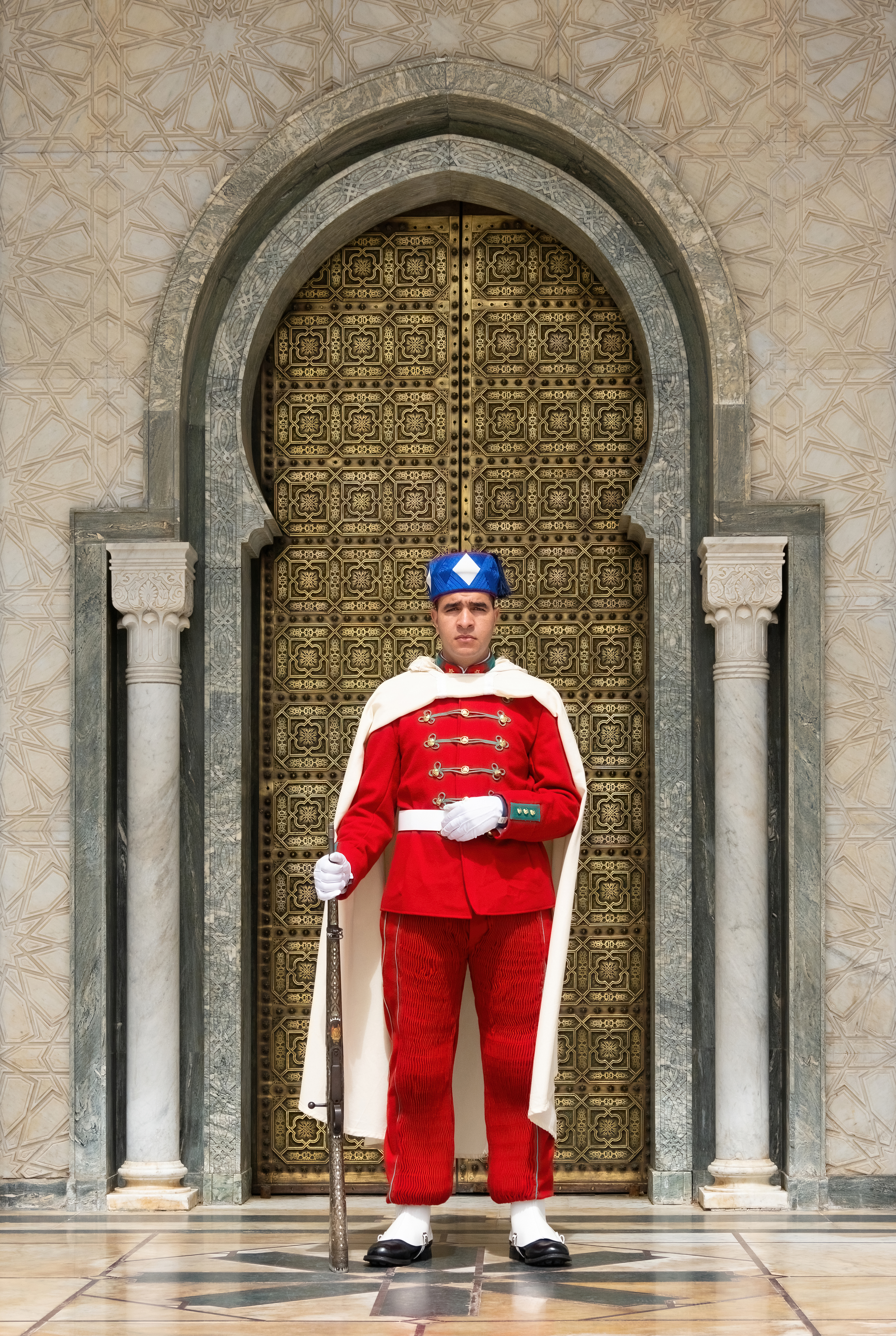
Honor guard at Mausoleum of Mohammed V

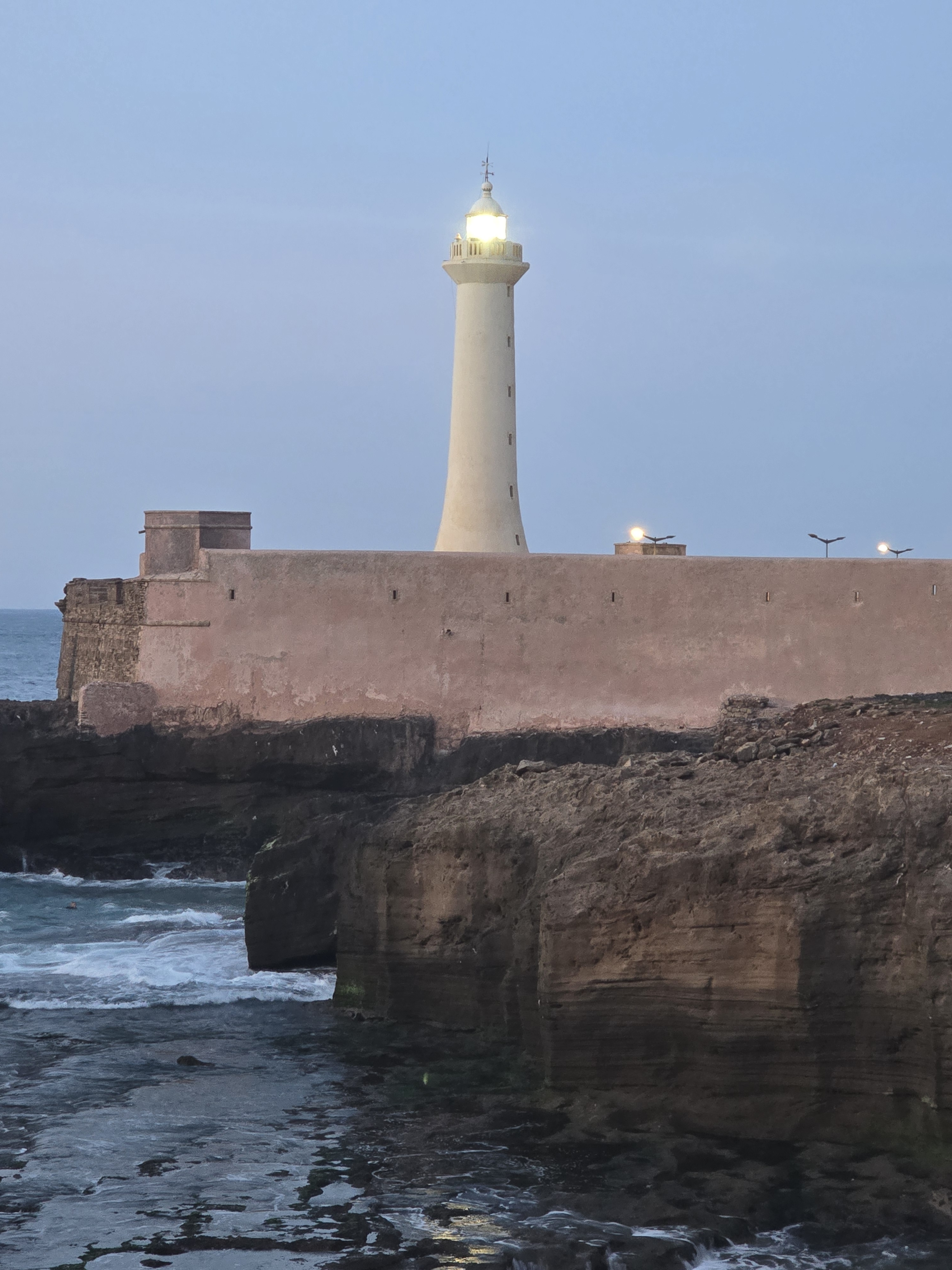
Rabat Lighthouse and (Fortress) Borj Sirat

== Education ==
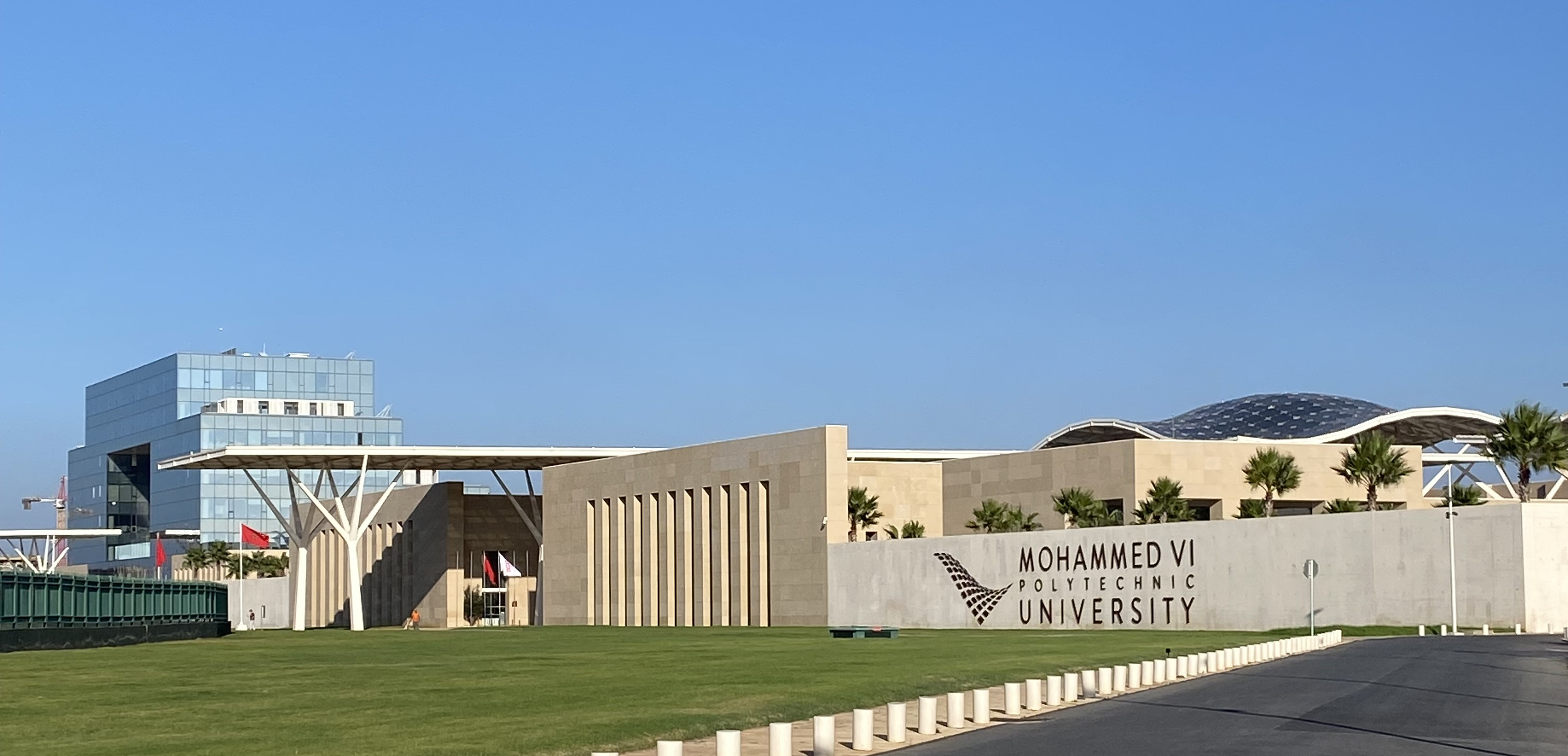
UM6P Rabat campus

=== Colleges and universities ===
Public:

- Mohammed V University was founded in 1957
- National Institute of Statistics and Applied Economics was founded 1961
- National School of Architecture (1980)

Private:

- HEM Business School, founded 1993

== Transport ==
Rabat-Salé Airport new terminal

=== Air ===
Rabat's main airport is Rabat–Salé Airport.

=== Trains ===
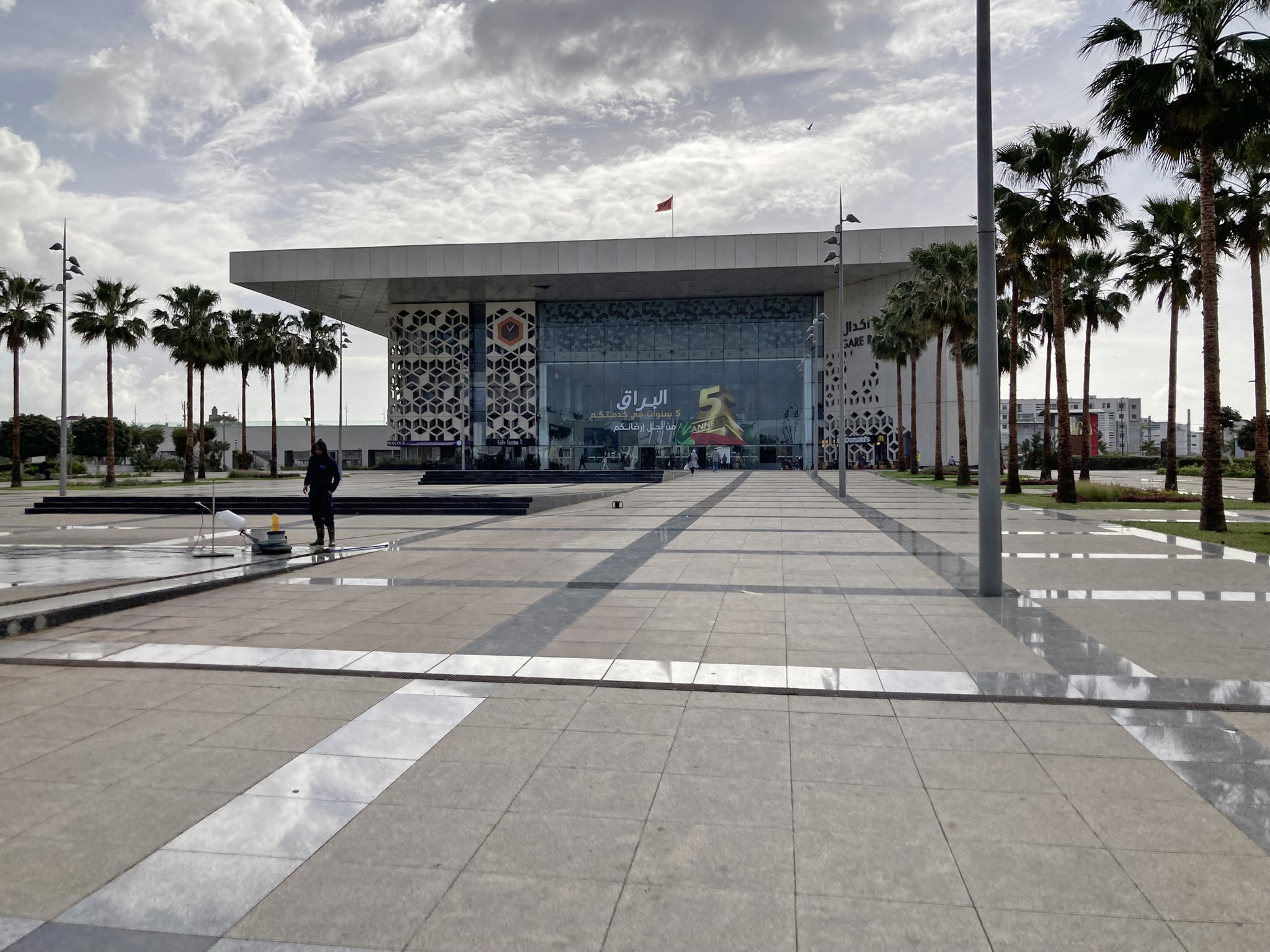
Rabat-Agdal Station

Rabat is served by two principal railway stations (Rabat-Agdal and Rabat Ville), and a local station Rabat Riad located in the Hay Riad district, inaugurated in late 2025 run by the national rail service ONCF.

Rabat-Ville and Rabat Agdal are the two main inter-city stations, from which trains run south to Casablanca, Marrakesh and El Jadida, north to Tangier, or east to Meknes, Fez, Taza and Oujda.

ONCF operates the Le Bouregreg urban rail for Rabat-Salé agglomeration. Marrakesh is a 4 hr journey, Fez 2 1/2 hr on an express train and 3 1/2 hr on other trains and Casablanca 1 hr.

=== Tram ===
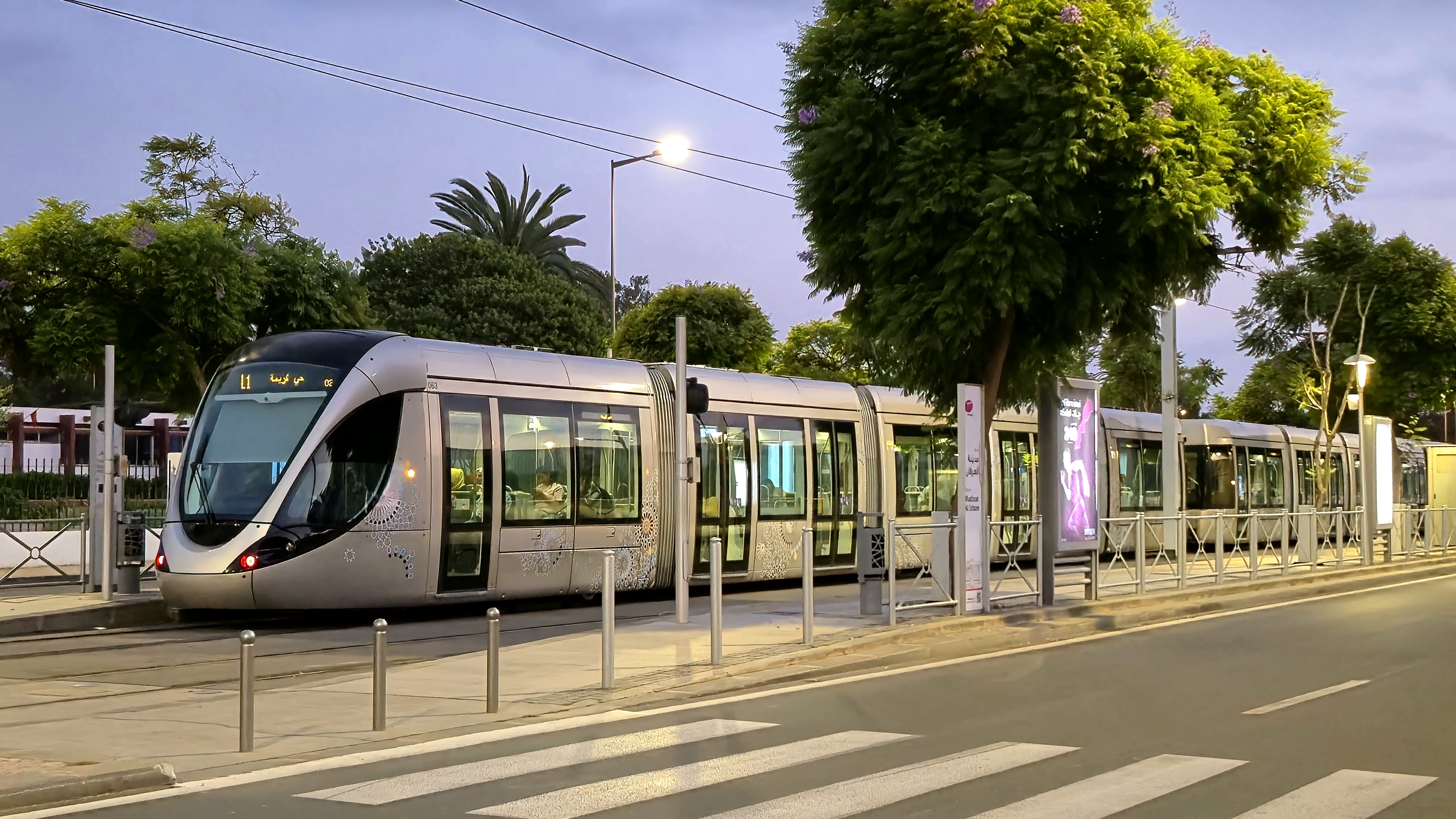
Rabat-Salé tramway

The Rabat–Salé tramway was the first tramway network in Morocco and connects Rabat with Salé across the river. It was opened on 11 May 2011 after a construction cost of 3.6 billion MAD. The network was constructed by Alstom Citadis and is operated by Transdev. As of February 2022, the network had two lines with a total length of 26.9 km (17 miles) and 43 stations. In 2023, an extension of the network was being planned and is due to be completed by 2028.

=== City buses ===
After some years of neglect as investment was directed at the tramway, the existing operator, STAREO, was displaced in 2019. A contract was awarded to Alsa-City Bus, a joint venture between Moroccan company City Bus and Spanish company Alsa, a subsidiary of the Mobico Group. The new operator took over in July 2019 with a commitment to three hundred and fifty new buses. These will comprise 102 Mercedes-Benz and 248 Scania vehicles. The contract covers a 15-year period, renewable for seven years, and promises approximately 10 billion MAD investment into the bus transport system in the region.

=== Regional Express Network ===
The national rail operator ONCF initiated construction on a Regional Express Network (RER) to enhance urban mobility across the Rabat-Salé-Kénitra region. The line covers a 54 km corridor connecting Kenitra to Skhirat, with stops in Salé, Rabat and Temara across 12 stations. The complete journey along the line will take approximately 1 hour and 10 minutes, operating at 15 minute intervals. with completion targeted ahead of the 2030 FIFA World Cup.

== Sport ==
Rabat hosted the 2019 African Games after Malabo, Equatorial Guinea was stripped of hosting due to economic matters. It was the first time the African Games were hosted by Morocco. It is one of the host cities for the 2030 FIFA World Cup.

=== Football ===
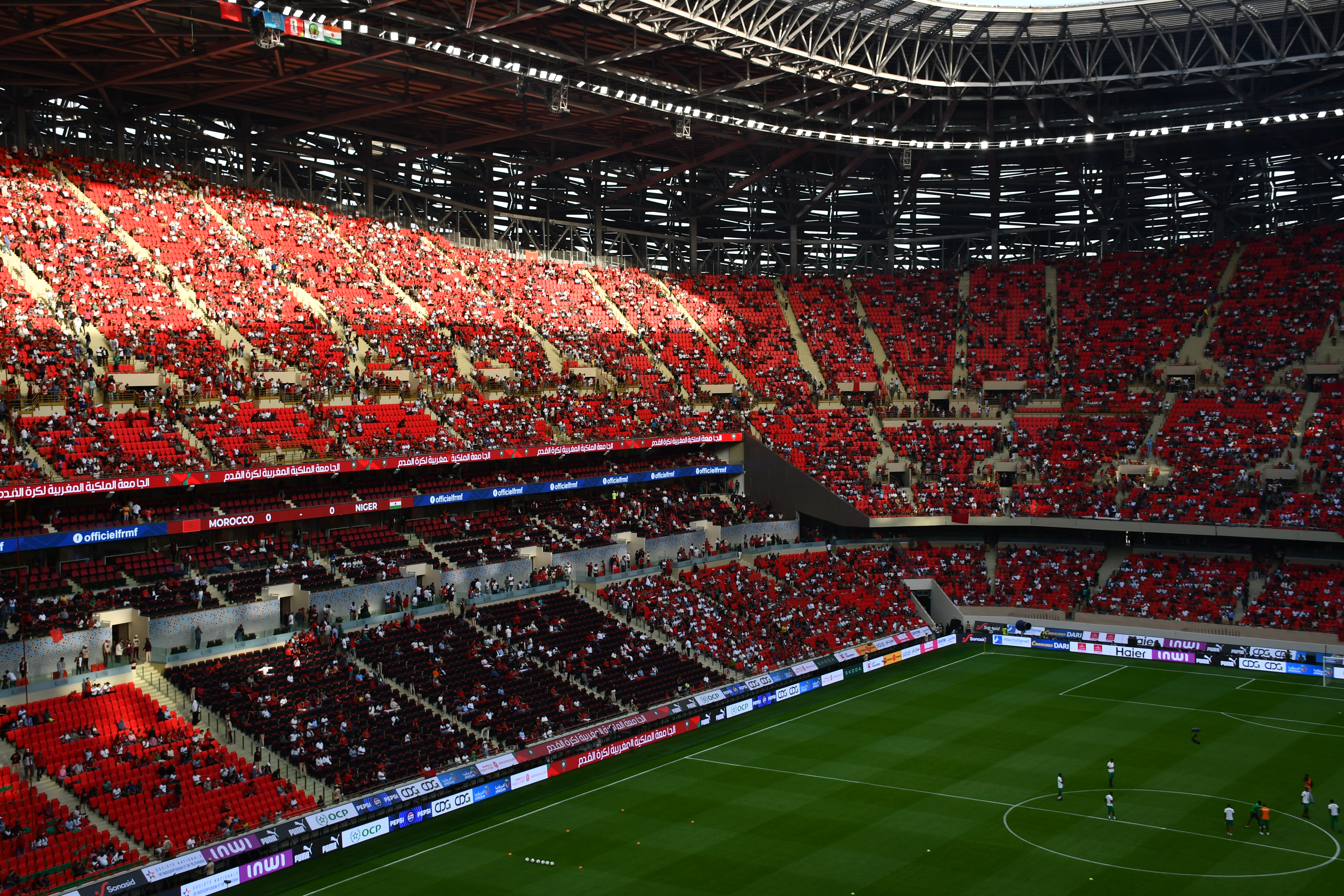
Prince Moulay Abdellah Stadium

The Prince Moulay Abdellah Stadium (Arabic: ملعب الأمير مولاي عبد لله) is a multi-purpose stadium. The new venue as of 2025 replaced the original Prince Moulay Abdellah stadium on the same site. The first stadium was built in 1983 and was the home ground of ASFAR (football club) and was mostly used for football matches, and it can also stage athletics competitions. The 1983 stadium held 52,000 spectators, whilst the new stadium has a seating capacity of 67,800 and will be used as a multi-purpose venue to host cultural events as well as sports. Since 2008, the 1983 stadium hosted the Meeting International Mohammed VI d'Athlétisme de Rabat. It is named after Prince Moulay Abdellah of Morocco.

Other football stadiums in the city include: Moulay El Hassan Stadium, Al Medina Stadium and Rabat Olympic Stadium.

Rabat's most popular sport club is the association football clubs AS FAR and FUS de Rabat. Well known in the continental competitions. AS FAR have won 2 major African titles, including 1 CAF Champions League and 1 CAF Confederation Cup. While Fus de Rabat has only managed to win one major African title, 1 CAF Confederation Cup.

The local football teams are:

- ASFAR (football club)
- ASFAR (women)
- FUS de Rabat
- Stade Marocain
- Hilal de Rabat
- Union de Touarga
- Youssoufia Club de Rabat

=== Basketball ===
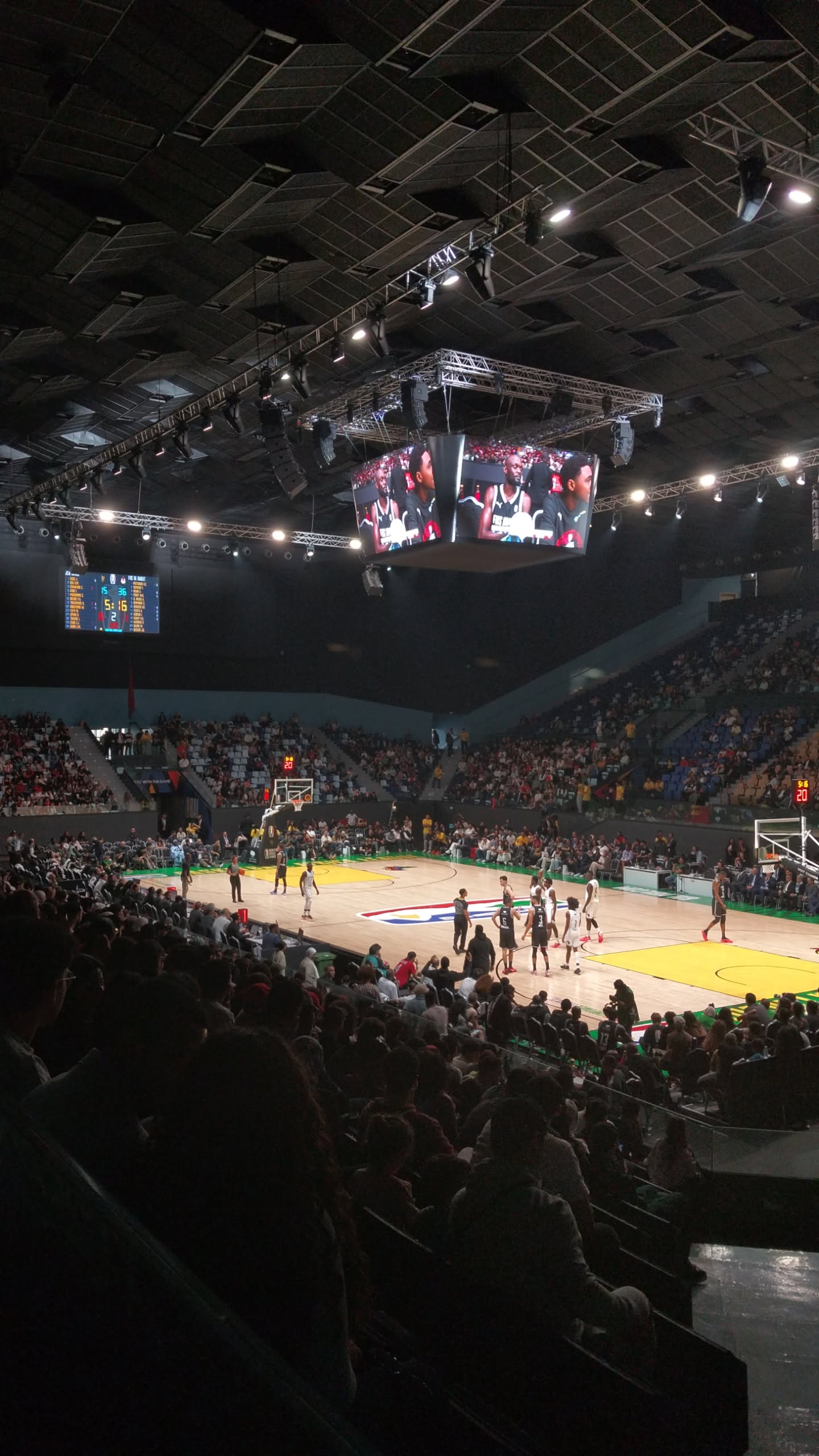
Basketball game at Salle Moulay Abdellah.

The local basketball teams are:

- ASFAR
- FUS de Rabat
- Moghreb de Rabat
- FAR

=== Handball ===
- ASFAR
- FUS de Rabat
- Le Stade Marocain

=== Volleyball ===
- ASFAR
- FUS de Rabat
- Crédit agricole Rabat

== Notable people ==
Politicians:

- Reuven Abergel, Moroccan-Israeli social-political activist
- Marc Perrin de Brichambaut, French judge and diplomat
- Dominique de Villepin, former Prime Minister of France
- Richard Dell'Agnola, French politician
- Omar El Bahraoui, former mayor of Rabat
- David Levy, Israeli politician
- Maxim Levy, Israeli politician
- Bernard Squarcini, French counter-terrorism director
- Asmaa Rhlalou, mayor of Rabat

Scientists, writers and philosophers:

- Abdellah Taïa, writer
- Mehdi Elmanjra, scholar
- Robert Assaraf, historian
- Alain Badiou, French philosopher
- Mohammed Suerte Bennani, Moroccan novelist
- Mohammed Berrada, Moroccan novelist, literary critic, and translator
- Helene Hagan, Franco-American writer anthropologist
- Abdelfattah Kilito, Moroccan writer
- Bahaa Trabelsi, Moroccan novelist
- Mohammad Naciri, Regional Director for the Arab States and Asia Pacific for the UN Women

Artists:

- Samira Said, Moroccan singer and actress
- Saad Lamjarred, Moroccan singer and actor
- Hajib, Moroccan Chaabi singer
- Shlomo Bar, Israeli musician
- Fabienne Égal, French announcer and television host
- Roland Giraud, French actor
- Macha Méril, French actress and writer
- Daniel Siboni, French photographer
- Stormy (rapper), Moroccan rapper and songwriter
- Bryce Hudson, American painter and photographer

Sports:

- Saïd Aït-Bahi, Moroccan footballer
- Rachid Benmahmoud, Former footballer
- Bouabid Bouden, Moroccan footballer
- Custodio Dos Reis, French road bicycle racer
- Younes El Aynaoui, Moroccan tennis player
- Adam Ennafati, footballer
- Younes Khattabi, Moroccan rugby league player
- Ait Hammi Miloud, Moroccan Olympic boxer
- Jean Patrick Lesobre, French Rugby Union player
- Younès Moudrik, Moroccan long jumper
- Youssef Rabeh, Former footballer
- Brahim Taleb, Moroccan long-distance runner

Royal descendants:

- Mohammed VI of Morocco, King of Morocco
- Prince Moulay Rachid of Morocco
- Princess Lalla Aicha of Morocco

== Twin towns – sister cities ==
Rabat is twinned with:

- Cairo, Egypt
- Guangzhou, China
- Honolulu, United States
- Istanbul, Turkey
- Lisbon, Portugal
- Lyon, France
- Madrid, Spain
- Nablus, Palestine
- Tunis, Tunisia
