= List of monuments in Rabat, Morocco =

This is a list of monuments that are classified by the Moroccan ministry of culture around Rabat.

== Monuments and sites in Rabat ==
Image		Name	Location	Coordinates	Identifier
	Upload Photo	Borj Sirat	Rabat	34°1'53.393"N, 6°50'38.645"W	pc_architecture/tm:0003
	Upload Photo	Fortifications of Rabat	Rabat	34°1'57.680"N, 6°50'12.980"W	pc_architecture/tm:0016
	Upload Photo	Medina of Rabat	Rabat	34°1'27.001"N, 6°49'22.001"W	pc_architecture/sanae:280013
	Upload Photo	Mausoleum of Mohammed V	Rabat	34°1'21.41"N, 6°49'19.01"W	pc_architecture/tm:0075
	Upload Photo	Chellah	Rabat	34°0'24"N, 6°49'13"W	pc_architecture/tm:0020
	Upload Photo	Botanical Garden of Rabat	Rabat	34°0'29.747"N, 6°50'45.139"W	pc_architecture/sanae:180032
	Upload Photo	Kasbah of the Udayas	Rabat	34°1'50"N, 6°50'8"W	pc_architecture/sanae:190014
	Upload Photo	Agency for the development of the Bouregreg valley	Rabat	34°1'3.601"N, 6°49'51.413"W	pc_architecture/idpcm:D97CBB
	Upload Photo	St. Peter's Cathedral (Rabat)	Rabat	34°1'12"N, 6°49'48"W	pc_architecture/sanae:100007
	Upload Photo	Rabat-City train station	Rabat	34°0'59.490"N, 6°50'8.038"W	pc_architecture/idpcm:F95F8
	Upload Photo	M'hammed Guessous School	Rabat	34°0'50.270"N, 6°50'38.911"W	pc_architecture/idpcm:53B36
	Upload Photo	Cinéma Royal	Rabat	34°1'15.823"N, 6°50'7.220"W	pc_architecture/idpcm:84E459
	Upload Photo	Hassan Tower	Rabat	34°1'26.7600"N, 6°49'21.7920"W	pc_architecture/sanae:290001
	Upload Photo	Fontaine	Rabat		pc_architecture/idpcm:C282AD
	Upload Photo	Remparts of Almohad	Rabat	34°0'47.045"N, 6°50'10.604"W	pc_architecture/sanae:410039
	Upload Photo	Bab Zaer	Rabat	34°0'22.381"N, 6°49'36.505"W	pc_architecture/sanae:410041
	Upload Photo	Borj Lalla Qadiya	Rabat	34°1'39.032"N, 6°49'52.655"W	pc_architecture/tm:0005
	Upload Photo	Lalla Tabernost Mosque	Rabat	34°1'31.919"N, 6°50'14.525"W	pc_architecture/idpcm:3D5C9B
	Upload Photo	Dar Mitawry	Rabat		pc_architecture/sanae:320147
	Upload Photo	Zawiya Sidi Ali Ben Hamdouch	Rabat	34°1'45.21378"N, 6°50'7.39349"W	pc_architecture/sanae:530075
	Upload Photo	Dar Er- Raghaï	Rabat		pc_architecture/sanae:320145
	Upload Photo	Palace Dar Trachen	Rabat	34°1'31.93626"N, 6°50'38.86368"W	pc_architecture/sanae:320162
	Upload Photo	Bab El Alou	Rabat	34°1'36.260"N, 6°50'30.847"W	pc_architecture/sanae:390033
	Upload Photo	Abu al-Hasan and Chams ed-Doha Tombs	Rabat	34°0'24.9"N, 6°49'23.0"W	pc_architecture/sanae:490002
	Upload Photo	Dar Mouline	Rabat	34°1'45"N, 6°50'14"W	pc_architecture/sanae:320149
	Upload Photo	Dar Hakam	Rabat		pc_architecture/idpcm:F91B99
	Upload Photo	Administration Alaouites for disabled people	Rabat		pc_architecture/idpcm:D36E
	Upload Photo	Bab Msalla	Rabat		pc_architecture/sanae:390096
	Upload Photo	Bab Chellah	Rabat	34°1'27.228"N, 6°49'59.261"W	pc_architecture/tm:0061
	Upload Photo	Bab El Bouiba	Rabat	34°1'22.080"N, 6°50'13.610"W	pc_architecture/tm:0062
	Upload Photo	Bab El Had	Rabat	34°1'19.070"N, 6°50'25.314"W	pc_architecture/tm:0063
	Upload Photo	Bab Lakbir	Rabat	34°1'51.377"N, 6°50'11.854"W	pc_architecture/sanae:390029
	Upload Photo	Bab el-Q'bibat	Rabat	34°1'0.091"N, 6°51'16.139"W	pc_architecture/sanae:390097
	Upload Photo	Borj Ed-Dar	Rabat	34°1'55.765"N, 6°50'24.479"W	pc_architecture/tm:0004
	Upload Photo	Borj Sidi Makhlouf	Rabat	34°1'35.598"N, 6°49'34.342"W	pc_architecture/tm:0006
	Upload Photo	Borj Sqala (Rabat)	Rabat	34°2'0.24090"N, 6°50'7.93000"W	pc_architecture/sanae:050012
	Upload Photo	Dar Bargach	Rabat		pc_architecture/sanae:320101
	Upload Photo	Source library	Rabat	34°1'13.555"N, 6°49'48.943"W	pc_architecture/sanae:100008
	Upload Photo	Saint-Pie-X church of Rabat	Rabat	33°59'20.810"N, 6°50'52.476"W	pc_architecture/sanae:100010
	Upload Photo	Saint-Joseph church	Rabat	34°1'20.330"N, 6°50'57.916"W	pc_architecture/sanae:100009
	Upload Photo	Oudaya Garden	Rabat	34°1'48.385"N, 6°50'7.721"W	pc_architecture/sanae:180003
	Upload Photo	Garden of Hilton hotel	Rabat	33°59'11.940"N, 6°50'33.299"W	pc_architecture/sanae:180076
	Upload Photo	Oudaia madrasa	Rabat	34°1'54.880"N, 6°50'9.384"W	pc_architecture/sanae:270011
	Upload Photo	Balima Hotel	Rabat	34°1'5"N, 6°50'7"W	pc_architecture/idpcm:82BC3F
	Upload Photo	Central Post Office Building	Rabat	34°1'10.337"N, 6°50'13.121"W	pc_architecture/idpcm:D57604
	Upload Photo	Maroc Télécom building	Rabat	34°1'8.648"N, 6°50'12.779"W	pc_architecture/idpcm:7817B2
	Upload Photo	Vatel hotel	Rabat		pc_architecture/idpcm:8EE80B
	Upload Photo	Majestic hotel	Rabat	34°1'16.489"N, 6°50'23.046"W	pc_architecture/idpcm:23E559
	Upload Photo	Gaulois hotel	Rabat	34°1'15.575"N, 6°50'16.404"W	pc_architecture/idpcm:2387BE
	Upload Photo	Cinéma Renaissance building	Rabat	34°1'12.580"N, 6°50'13.859"W	pc_architecture/idpcm:F595FD
	Upload Photo	Comedia building café	Rabat	34°1'13.480"N, 6°50'13.330"W	pc_architecture/idpcm:E8DCC1
	Upload Photo	Bab el Bahr	Rabat	34°1'39.108"N, 6°49'54.304"W	pc_architecture/tm:0068
	Upload Photo	Fort Hervé	Rabat	34°1'29.986"N, 6°51'3.233"W	pc_architecture/tm:0023
	Upload Photo	Molina Mosque	Rabat	34°1'14.693"N, 6°50'4.931"W	pc_architecture/sanae:300003
	Upload Photo	Hassan Mosque	Rabat	34°1'20.849"N, 6°49'18.941"W	pc_architecture/tm:0049
	Upload Photo	Zaouia Tijania	Rabat	34°1'39.320"N, 6°50'6.997"W	pc_architecture/idpcm:26AD4
	Upload Photo	Naciria Zaouia	Rabat	34°1'36.822"N, 6°50'11.213"W	pc_architecture/idpcm:4BA00
	Upload Photo	Ahmed Bennani Mosque	Rabat	34°1'34.010"N, 6°50'12.059"W	pc_architecture/idpcm:D7E9D9
	Upload Photo	Mamounia hotel, Rabat	Rabat	34°1'15.384"N, 6°50'21.286"W	pc_architecture/idpcm:AD230B
	Upload Photo	Oudaias hotel	Rabat	34°1'46.88"N, 6°50'13.92"W	pc_architecture/idpcm:2B9A14
	Upload Photo	Terminus Hotel	Rabat	34°0'57.467"N, 6°50'7.296"W	pc_architecture/idpcm:9669CD
	Upload Photo	Moulay Youssef College	Rabat	34°0'48.100"N, 6°50'1.900"W	pc_architecture/sanae:670001
	Upload Photo	Bou Regreg	Salé	34°1'55"N, 6°49'51"W	pc_architecture/sanae:450016
	Upload Photo	Bab ar-Rwah	Rabat	34°0'46.199"N, 6°50'15.500"W	pc_architecture/tm:0066
	Upload Photo	Belvédère Park	Rabat	34°0'29.948"N, 6°50'22.589"W	pc_architecture/idpcm:0BE50
	Upload Photo	The Great Mosque of Rabat	Rabat	34°1'32.743"N, 6°50'0.953"W	pc_architecture/idpcm:8EBD63
	Upload Photo	Telegraphy Gate	Rabat	34°1'29.88325"N, 6°49'51.12178"W	pc_architecture/sanae:390034
	Upload Photo	Nouzhat Hassan garden	Rabat	34°1'20.107"N, 6°50'2.512"W	pc_architecture/sanae:180102
	Upload Photo	Pirates Tower	Rabat	34°1'58.915"N, 6°50'7.246"W	pc_architecture/sanae:050011
	Upload Photo	Al-Atiq Mosque	Rabat	34°1'54.984"N, 6°50'8.912"W	pc_architecture/tm:0059
	Upload Photo	Moulay Rachid Kasbah	Rabat	34°1'47.12102"N, 6°50'19.45237"W	pc_architecture/tm:0022
	Upload Photo	Kasba Dchira	Skhirat	33°53'54.118"N, 6°57'33.937"W	pc_architecture/sanae:190044
