= Andalusian wall of Rabat =

Coordinates: 34°01′26.9″N 6°49′59.2″W

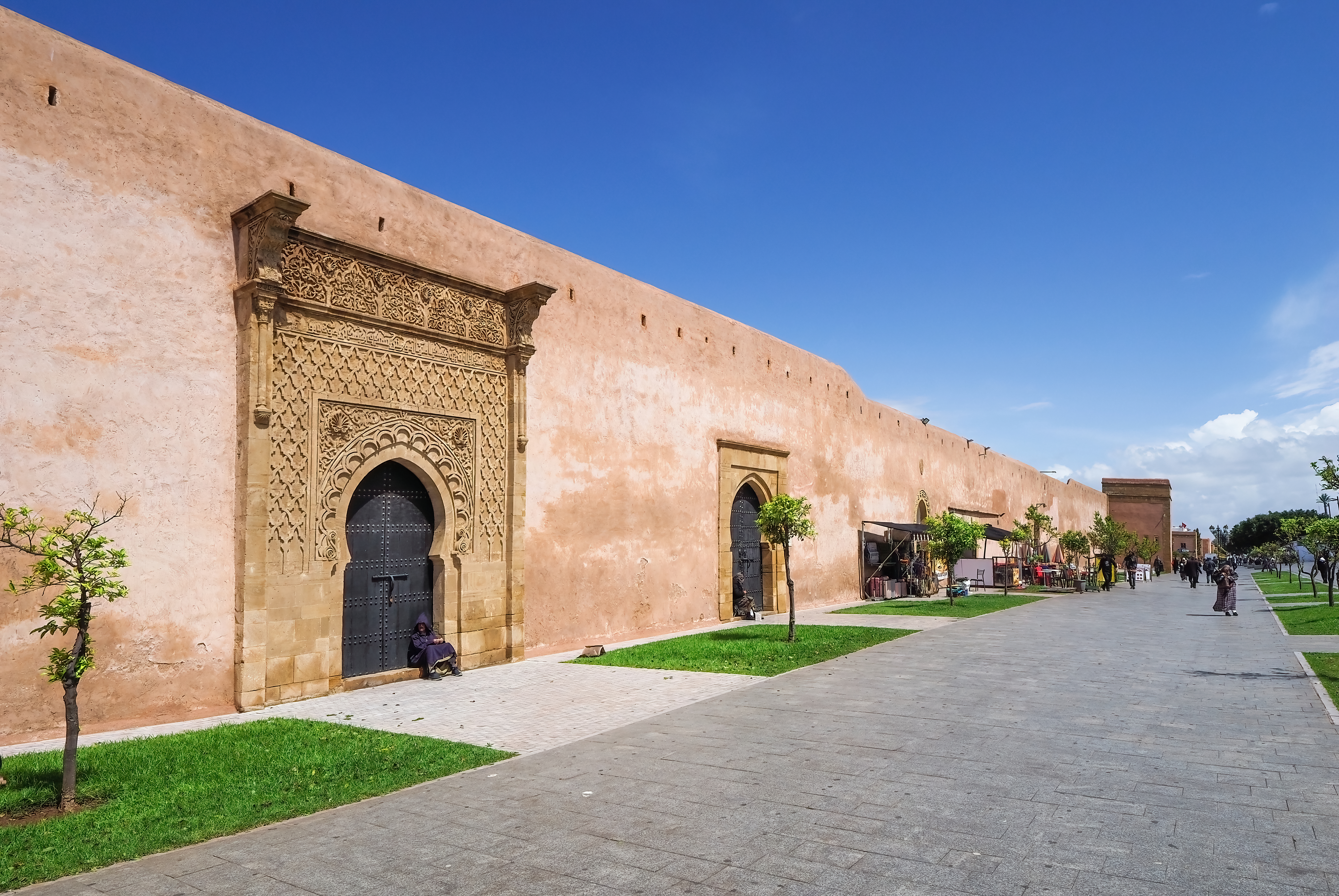
The Andalusian wall, seen from Avenue Hassan II

The Andalusian wall (Arabic: السور الأندلسي) is the wall that delimits the southern border of the medina of Rabat, Morocco.

== Background ==
The wall was built at the beginning of the 17th century and delimited the district where Morisco refugees settled, mostly after their expulsion from Spain in 1609. This district, the present-day "medina", comprises the northern part of the planned city which the Almohads began constructing in the late 13th century but which had been left practically uninhabited and mainly occupied by open fields. The wall delimits the southern edge of this medina.

== Description ==
The wall is over 1.4 km long, and its height varies between 4.9 m and 5.5 m for an average thickness of 1.65 m. It surrounds an area of 840 hectares. A total of 26 towers are interspersed along the wall.

=== Gates ===
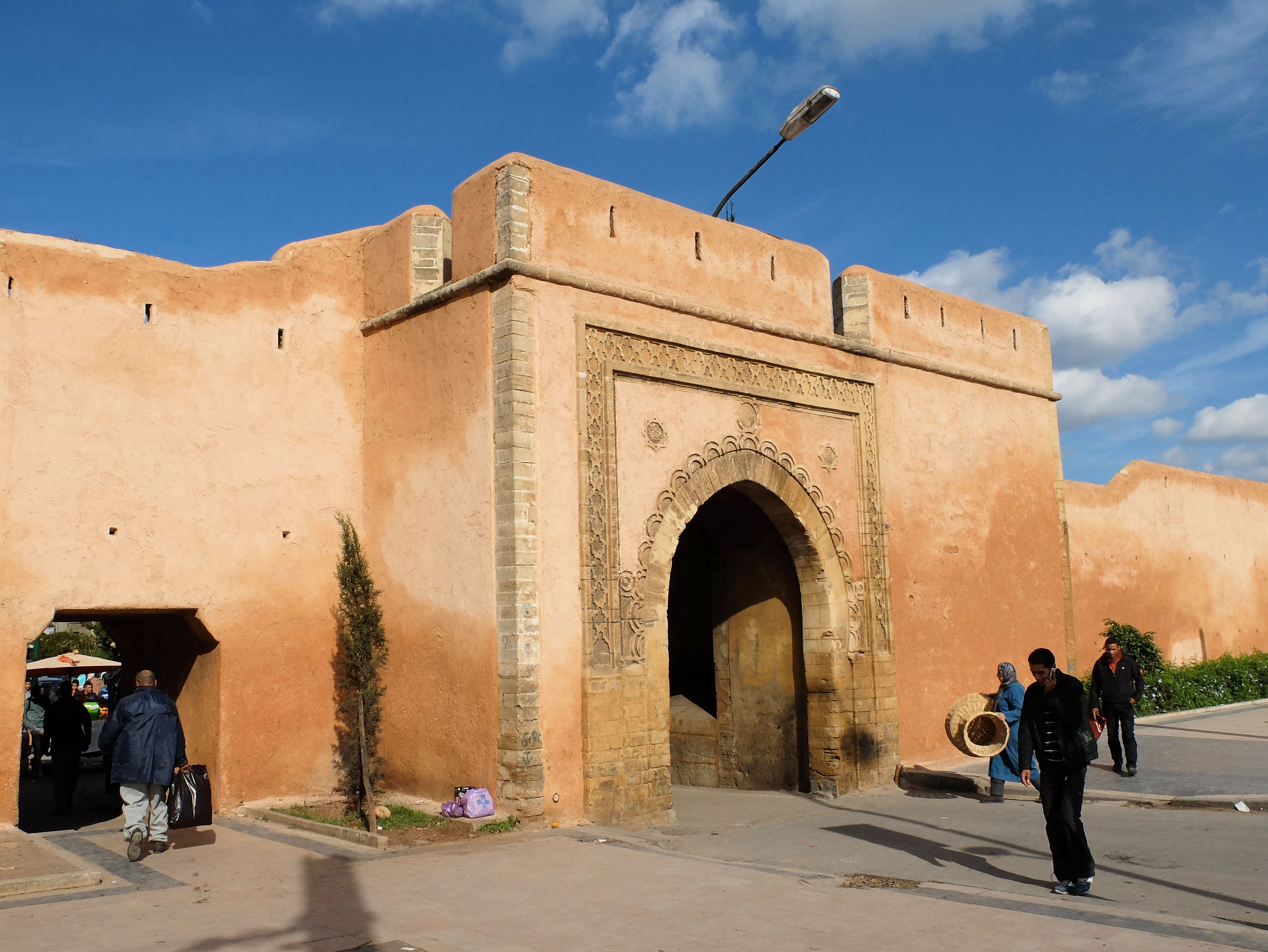
Bab Chellah

The wall was pierced by five gates, not all of which have been preserved today. Bab Teben or Bab al-Tben ("Gate of Hay"), was the westernmost gate (close to Bab el-Hadd in the Almohad wall). Today the area is known as Bab Jdid ("New Gate") and the gate was largely demolished to make way for new buildings. Only one side tower and chamber from the former gate has been preserved and is now used as a police post. A minor gate, Bab al-Bouiba ("the Small Gate"), exists further east from here. Towards the middle of the wall is the gate called Bab Chellah ("Gate of Chellah"), the only one with a slightly monumental appearance. Its current form dates from a reconstruction in 1813 under Sultan Moulay Sliman. Its decoration is reminiscent of older Almohad gates in the city, although in simpler form. Two more gates to the east are simple openings with little architectural significance: Bab Mellah ("Gate of the Mellah"), the gate to the old Jewish quarter, and Bab Diouana, a gate now converted into a mosque entrance.

=== Bastions ===
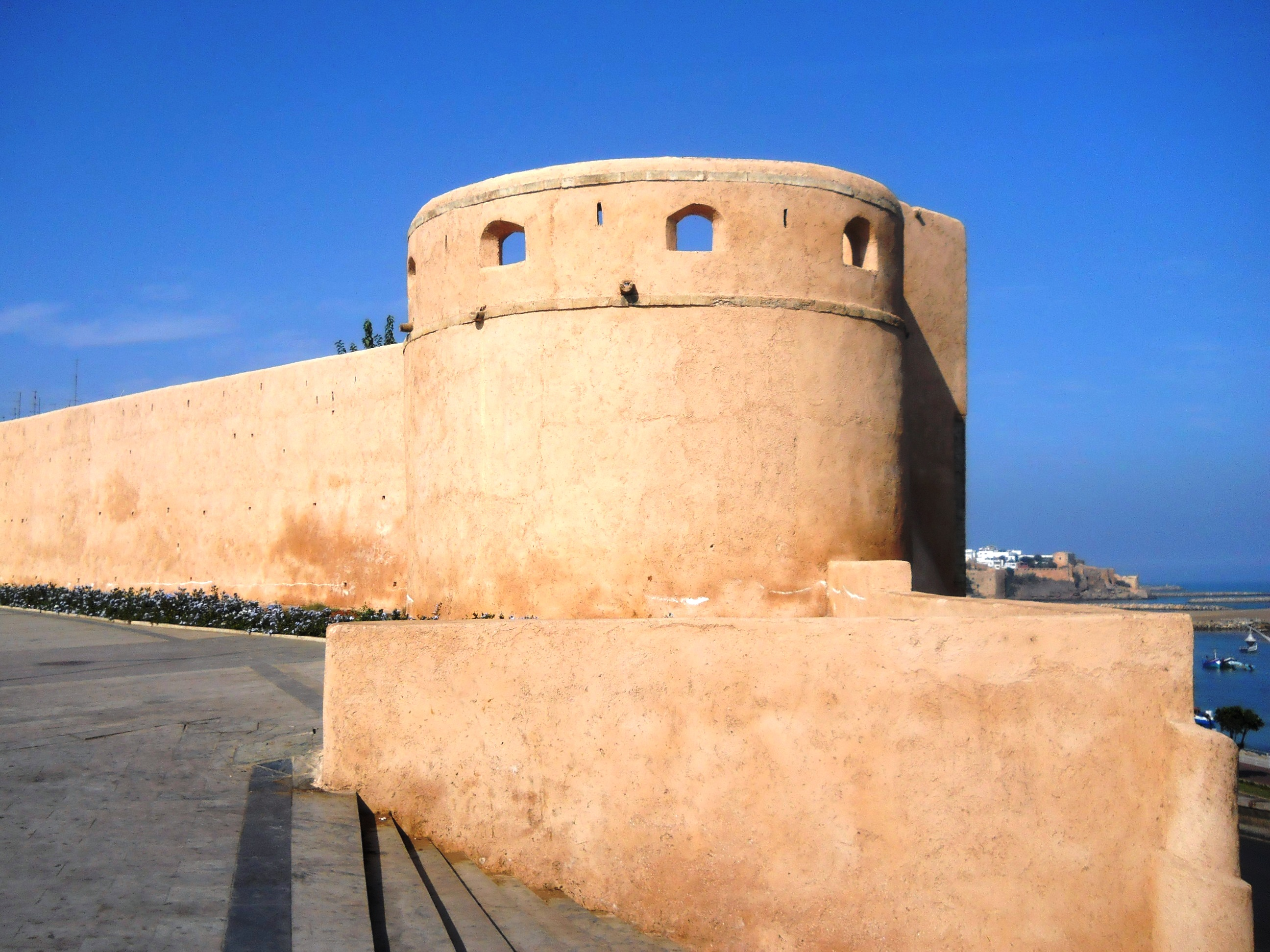
Borj Sidi Makhlouf

At the wall's eastern end, near the river, is a bastion tower named Borj Sidi Makhlouf ("Tower of Sidi Makhlouf"), which was built to guard the nearby port. This is the only tower of the wall which has a rounded profile. It is named after a local marabout of Jewish origin, Sidi Makhlouf, whose tomb is adjoined to it. The bastion dates from the 18th century, but was most likely repaired sometime after being bombarded by the English in 1637. Another tower, called Borj Lalla Qdiya or Borj Qadia ("Tower of (Lady) Qadiya"), is situated on the northeastern perimeter of the medina, away from the main Andalusian wall, but also dates from the 17th century. Rather than a fortified bastion, the tower served as an observation post. It has a simple design with a square base and is about 9 meters tall.
