= Avenue Mohammed V =

Avenue Mohammed V is the name of thoroughfares in numerous cities in Morocco and elsewhere, honoring King Mohammed V of Morocco:

- Avenue Mohammed V, Rabat
- Avenue Mohammed V (Tunis)
