= Avenue Mohammed V, Rabat =

Street in Rabat, Morocco

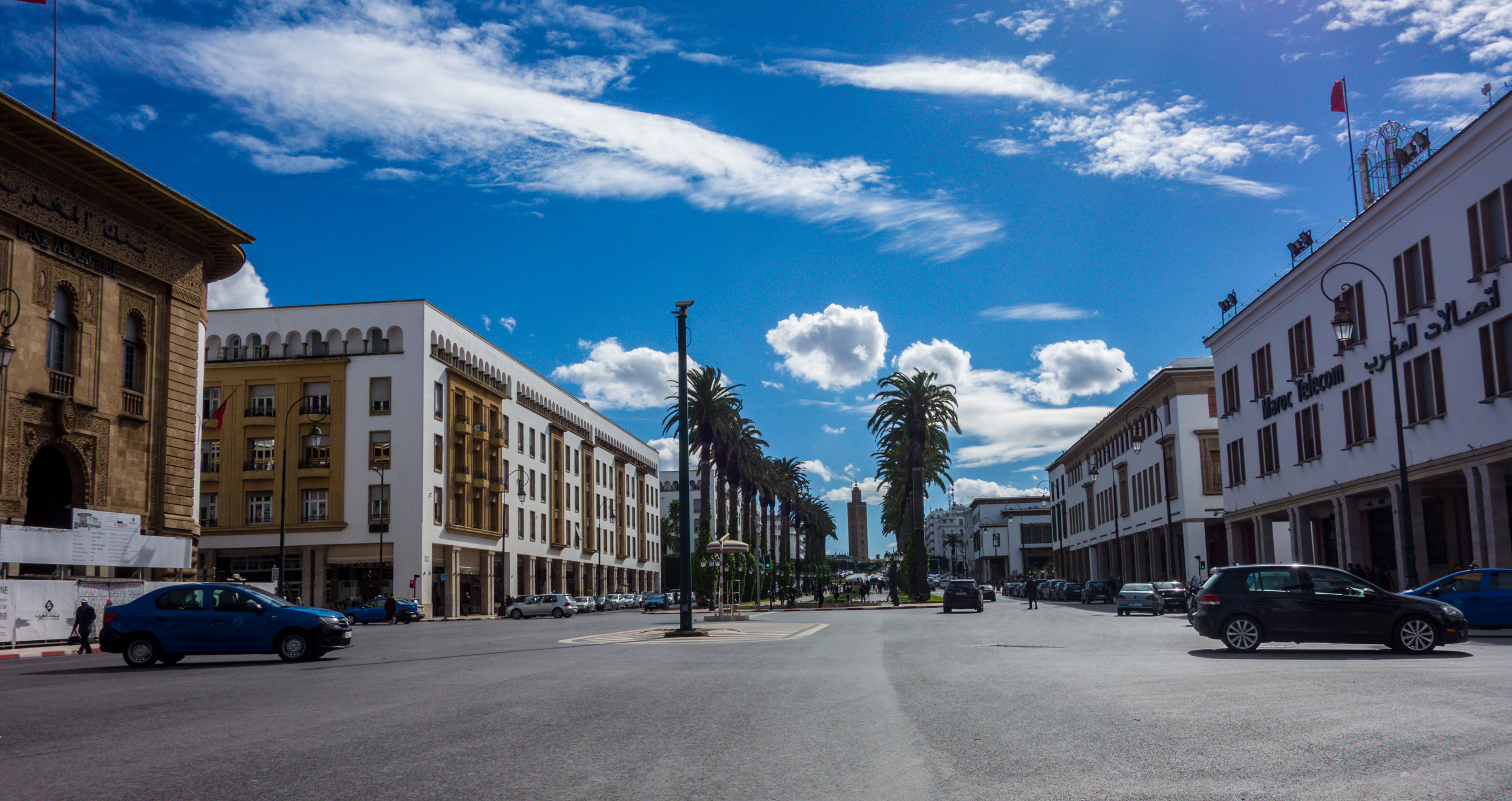
Northern end of the avenue's wider segment, with Bank Al-Maghrib on the left and Maroc Telecom on the right

Avenue Mohammed V, sometimes referred to by its old name Avenue Dar al-Makhzen (lit. 'Royal Palace Avenue'), is a major thoroughfare in downtown Rabat, Morocco. Its main section was created under the French Protectorate in Morocco and mostly developed between 1915 and 1932, when it was also known as Cours Lyautey. At the southern end of that section is the As-Sunna Mosque, whose history dates back to the 18th century like that of the nearby royal palace or Dar el-Makhzen.

== Name ==
Before Moroccan independence in March 1956, what is now Avenue Mohammed V used to come under several names: from north to south, rue el Gza, rue Bab Jdid, rue Bab Teben, all three in the old medina; avenue Dar el-Makhzen, between Boulevard Galliéni (later renamed Avenue Hassan II), and rue de la Maréchale (west) / rue Maurice Pascouet (east; later renamed into, respectively, Avenue Soekarno in 1960 and Avenue Al Mansour Addahbi); Cours Lyautey, between Avenue Soekarno / Al Mansour Addahbi and Avenue Moulay Hassan with the As-Sunna Mosque (this section was also known as avenue Dar el-Makhzen); and Avenue des Touarga, running southeast beyond the mosque into the ministries' neighborhood and leading to the Protectorate Residence. All these tracks were renamed in honor of then-reigning King Mohammed V in July 1956.

== Urban design ==
Avenue Mohammed V is a prime example of urban design in the context of the French protectorate, in which first resident-general Hubert Lyautey promoted the creation of "new cities" (French: villes nouvelles) next to the older medinas that were preserved in their traditional urban form. In Rabat as in Casablanca, Fez, Marrakesh and Meknes, the design of Rabat's new city was led by Henri Prost, with assistance for landscaping by Jean-Claude Nicolas Forestier.

== Notable buildings ==
The avenue's northern section is one of the thoroughfares that intersect Rabat's old medina, lined with shops and several mosques. The point where it crosses the Andalusian wall of Rabat is the location of the city's central market built in the early protectorate era, for which the ancient gate of Bab Tben was demolished. Further to the south, the avenue's wider central segment is lined with a number of iconic buildings hosting major Moroccan institutions. These include, roughly from north to south and from west to east:

- a former court building built in the 1920s;
- the central Rabat office of Poste Maroc, designed by Adrien Laforgue and Albert Laprade, completed in 1918;
- the head office of Bank Al-Maghrib (until 1959 the State Bank of Morocco), designed by Auguste Cadet and Edmond Brion and completed in 1925;
- a building used by Maroc Telecom;
- the former Trésorerie générale, designed by Adrien Laforgue, completed in 1930;
- the Parliament of Morocco, formerly Rabat's central court building designed by Adrien Laforgue, completed in 1932 and repurposed as parliament in the 1970s;
- on the eastern side, a row of arcaded commercial buildings including the higher-rise Balima Hotel, designed by François Robert and completed in 1932;
- the Gare de Rabat-Ville, designed by Adrien Laforgue and completed in 1923;
- the Constitutional Court of Morocco created in 2011, facing Avenue Moulay Hassan and occupying part of the former Immeuble Djazouli that hosted the directorate of postal services during the protectorate, designed by François Robert;
- the Mohammed VI Museum of Modern and Contemporary Art, designed by Karim Chakor and opened in 2014;
- the Lycée Moulay Youssef high school, opened in 1916;
- the As-Sunna Mosque, originally built in the 18th century and much altered since then.

Further southeast, the avenue is bordered by ministries and ends at the entrance of the former protectorate residence, now Ministry of Interior, designed by Albert Laprade and completed in 1924:

- Villa des Arts, Al Mada Foundation;
- Inspectorates of the Royal Moroccan Armed Forces;
- Ministry of Health;
- Minister of Agriculture and Fisheries;
- Ministry of Equipment;
- Ministry of Economy and Finance;
- Secretariat-General of the Government.

== Gallery ==
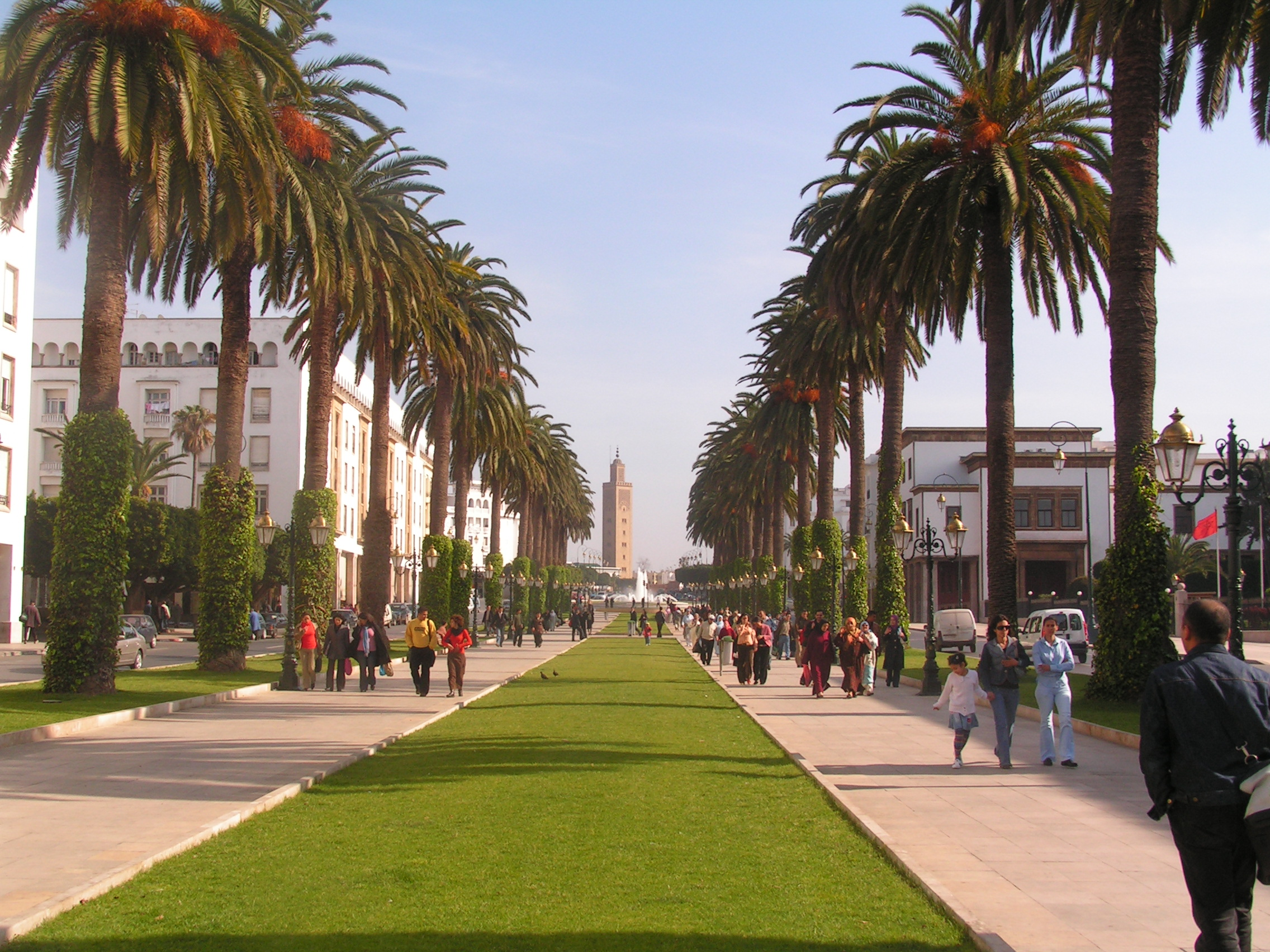
Perspective of the avenue with the As-Sunna Mosque at its southern end

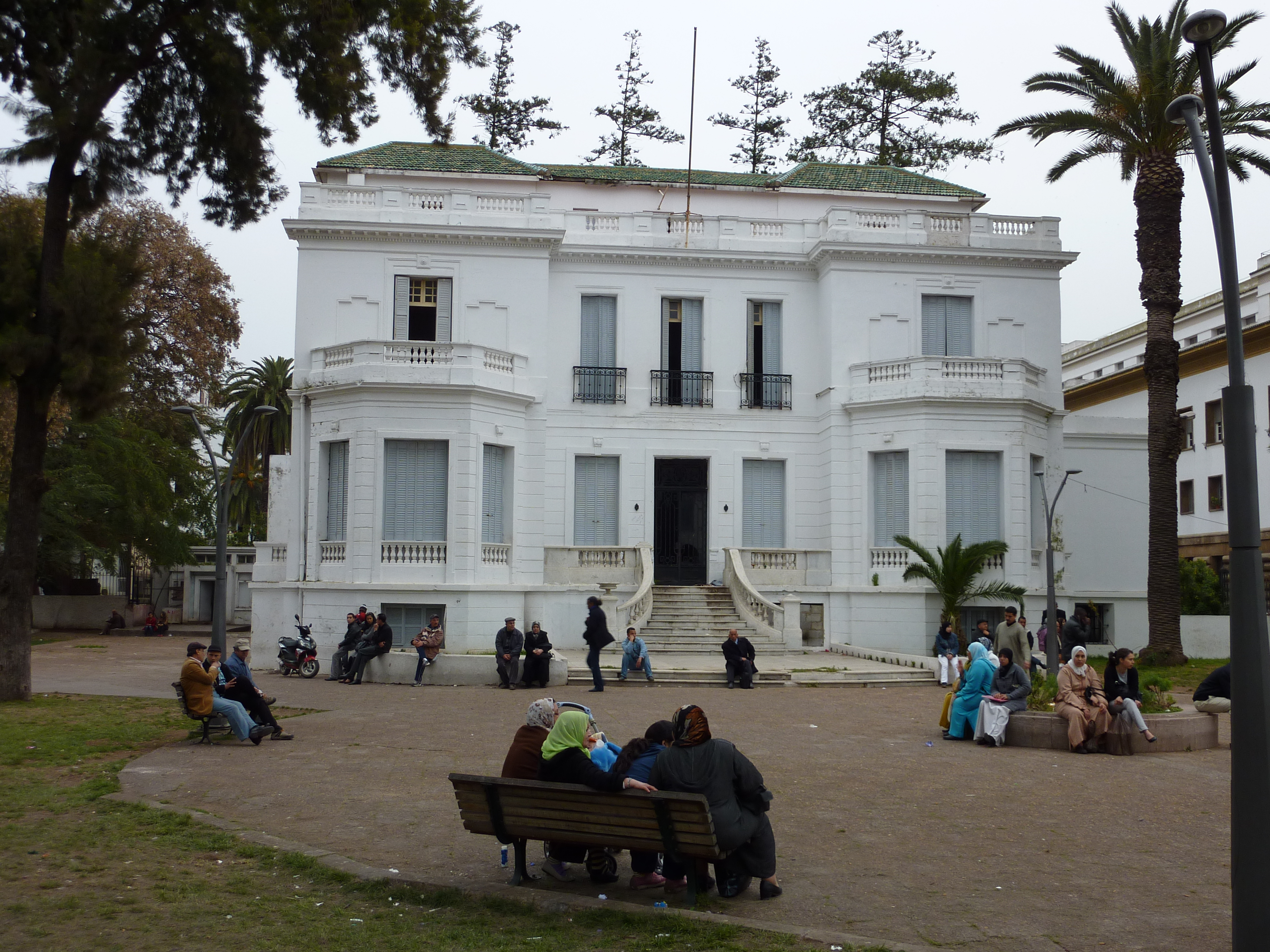
Former court building

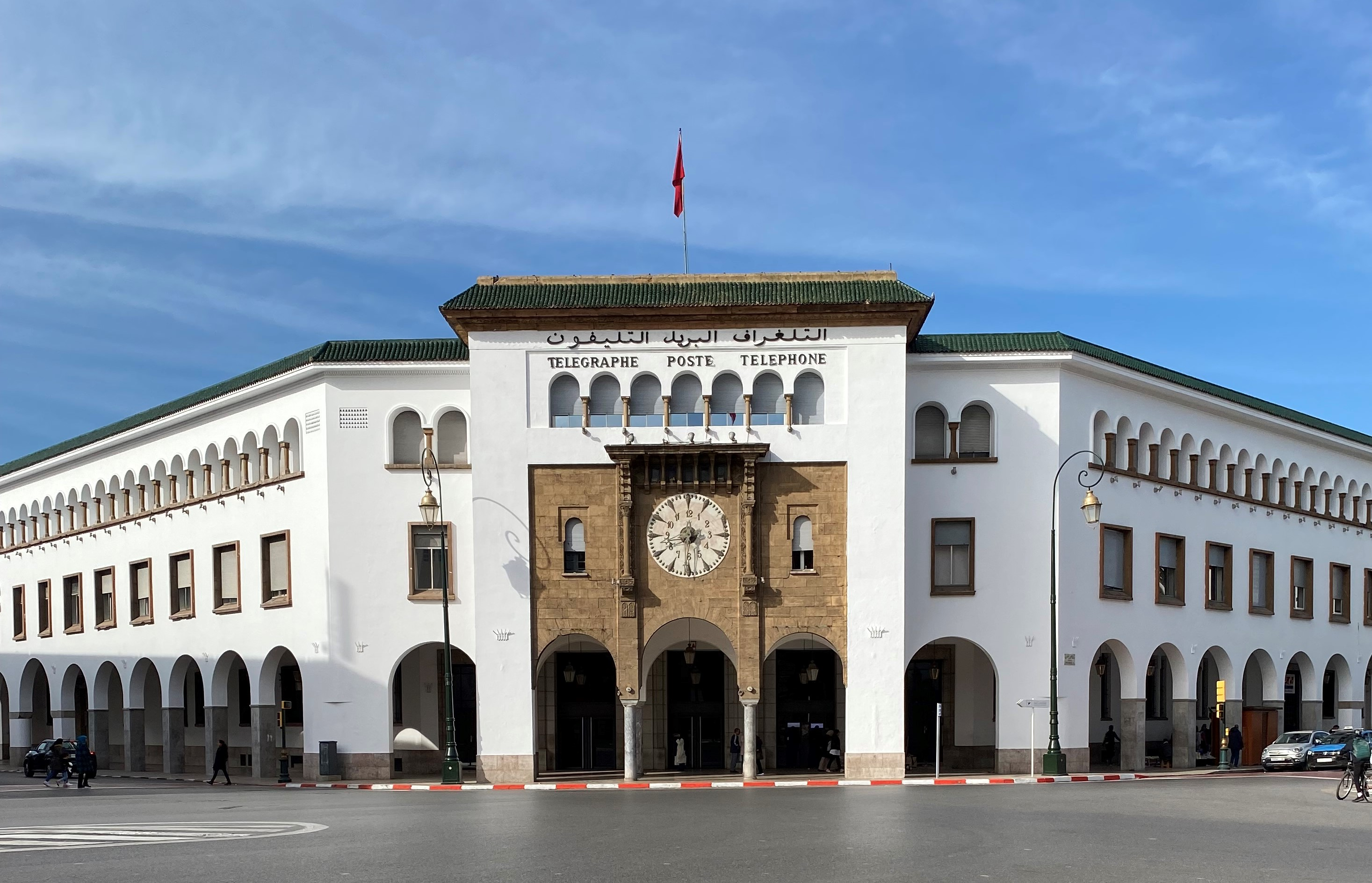
Central Post Office

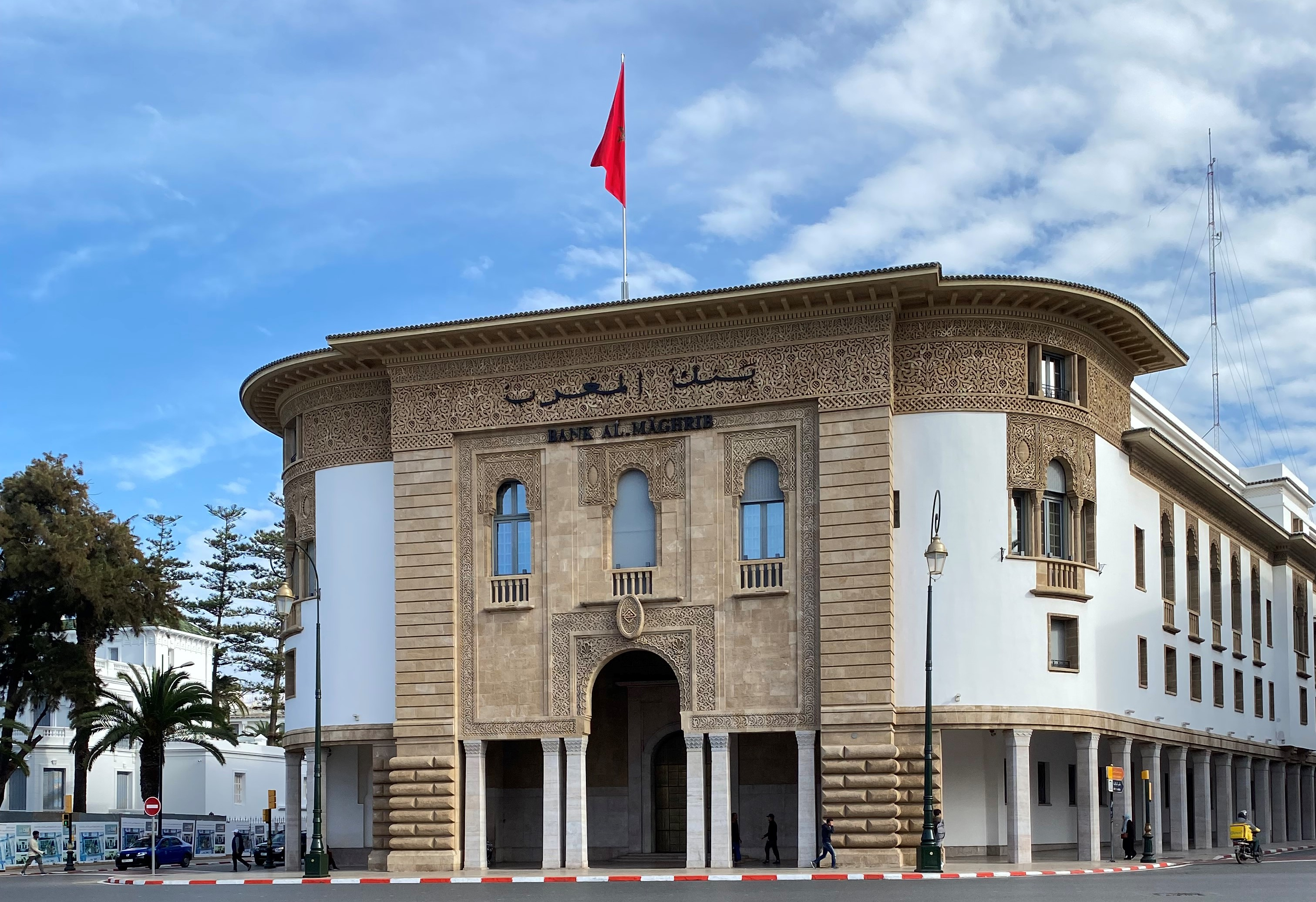
Bank Al-Maghrib

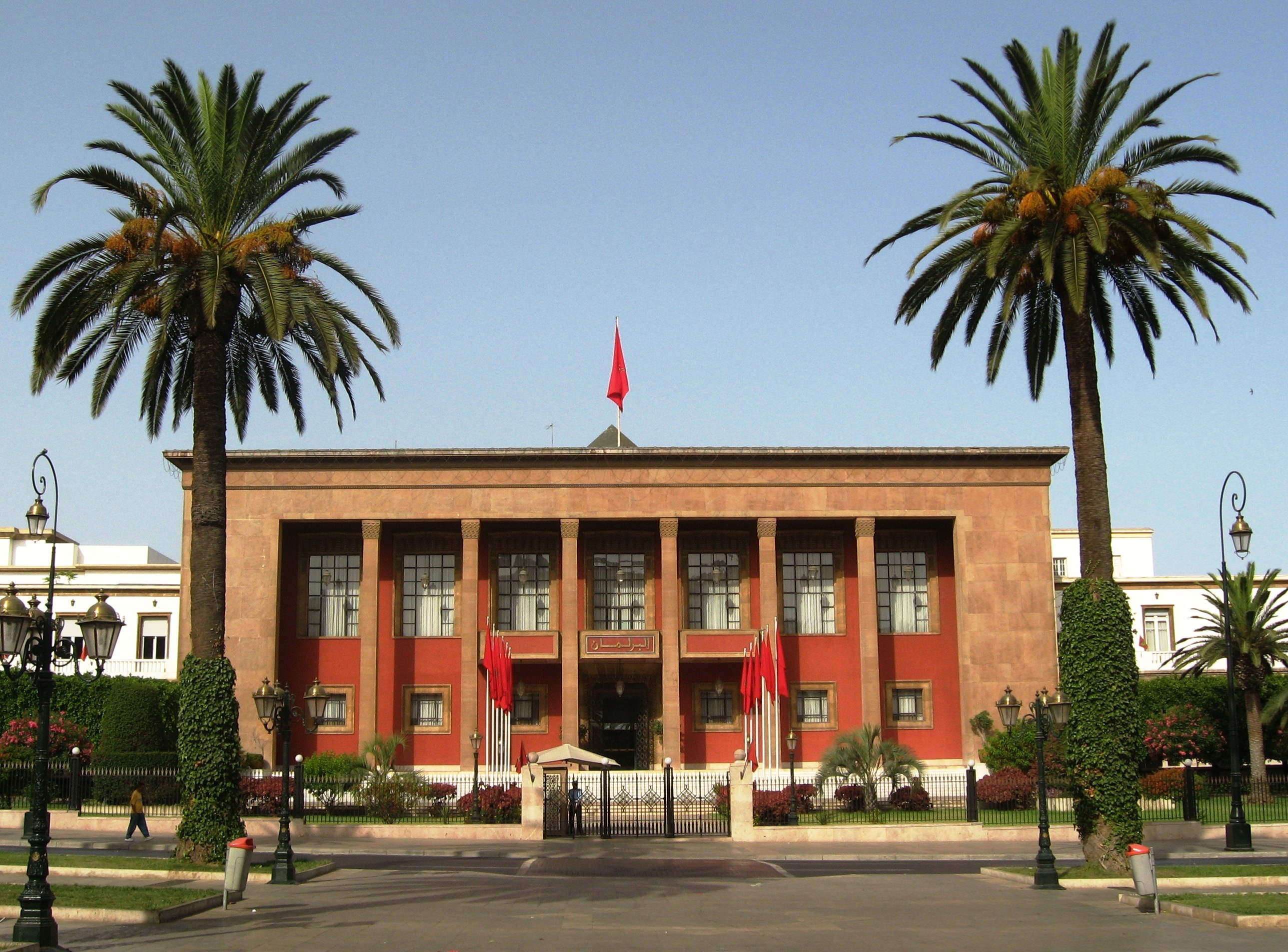
Parliament building

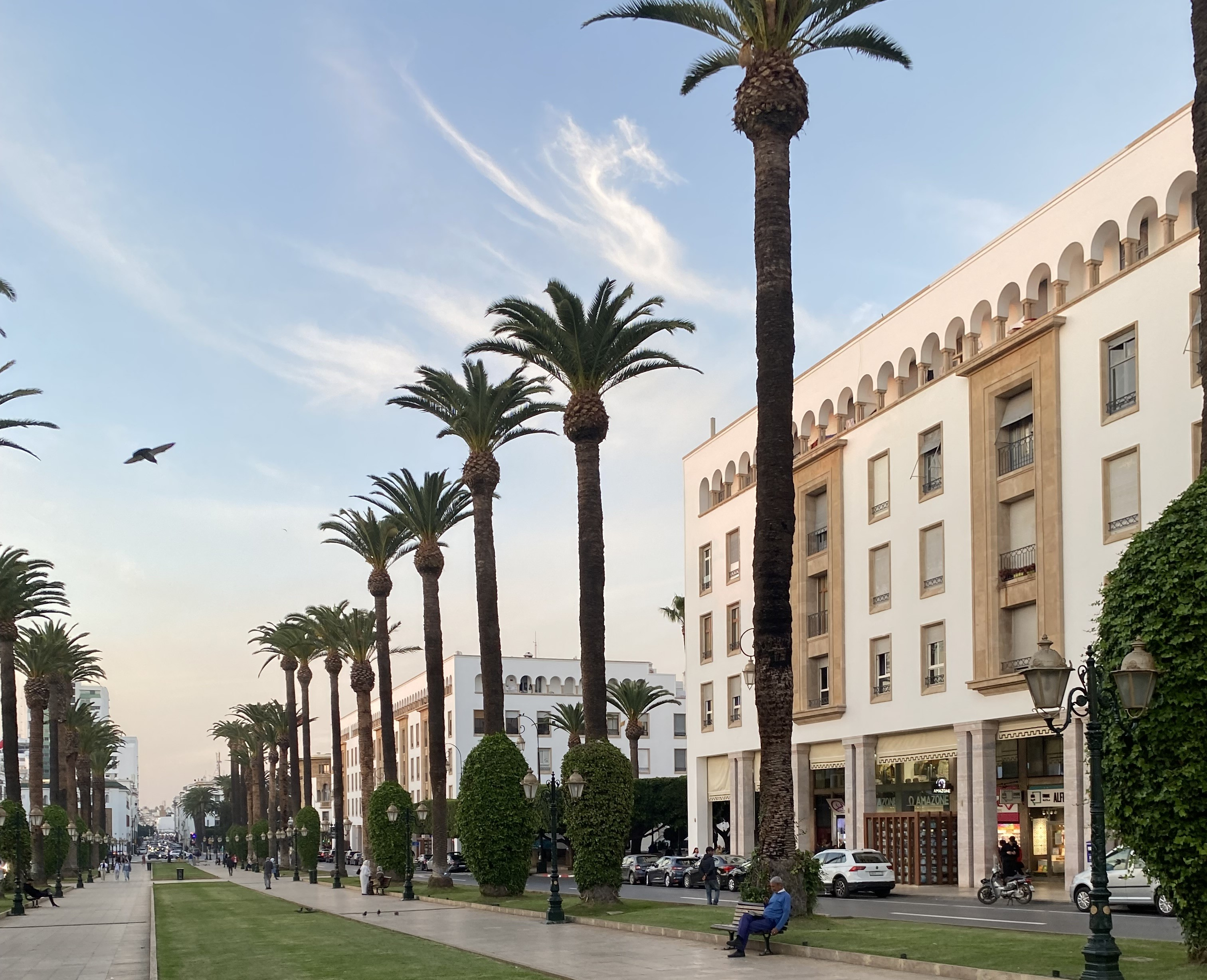
Commercial buildings on the avenue's eastern side

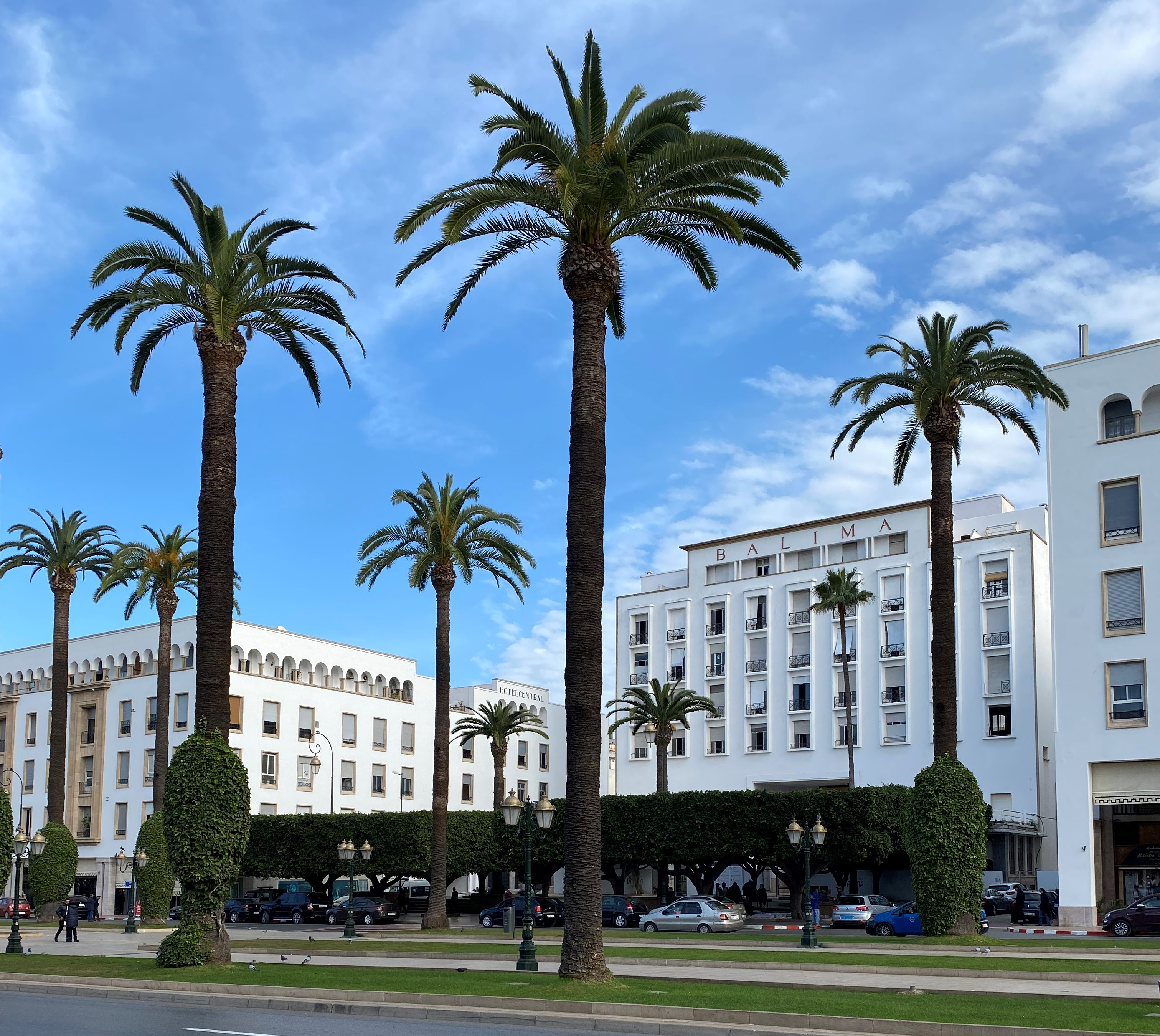
Balima Hotel

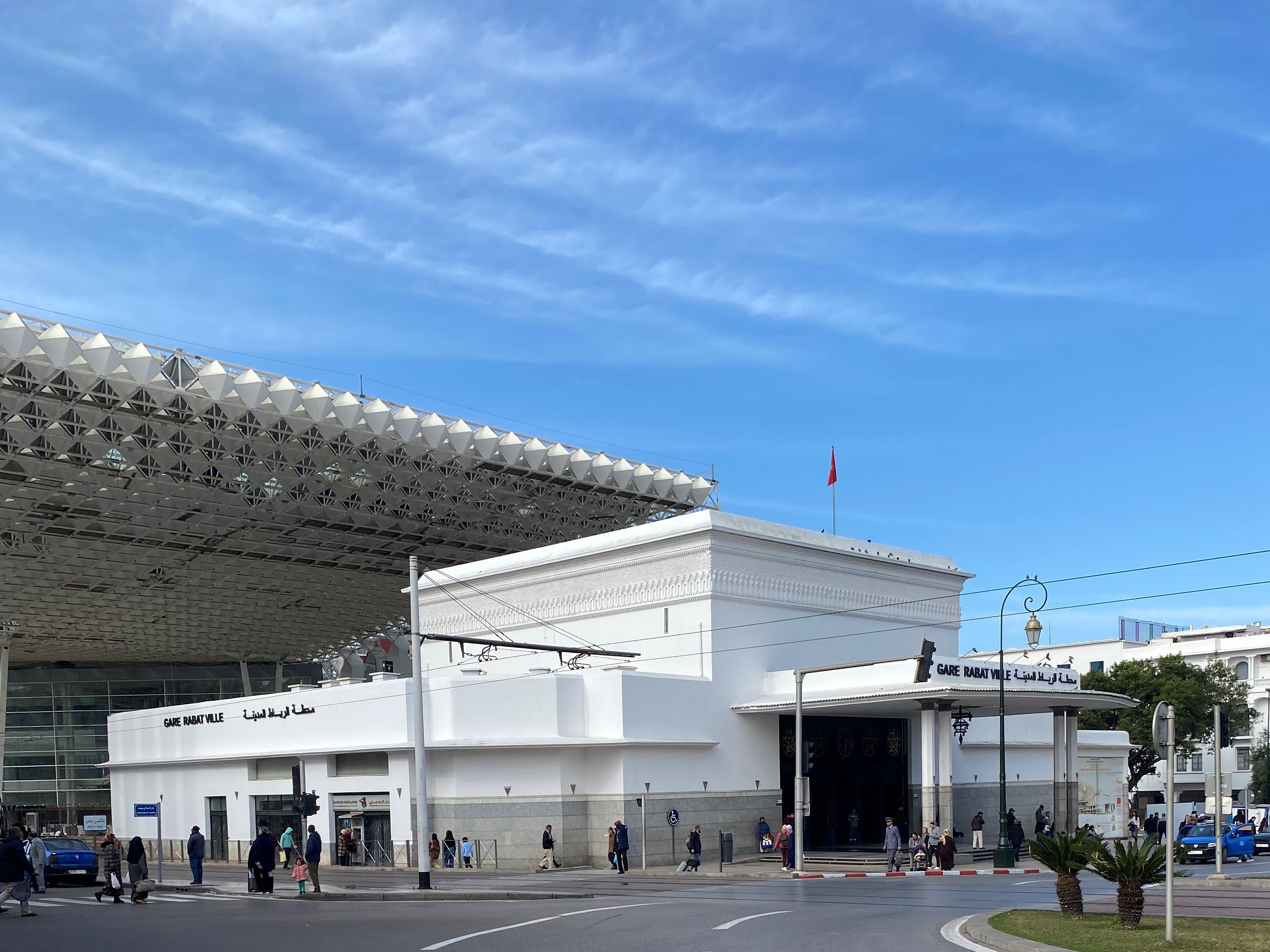
Rabat-Ville train station

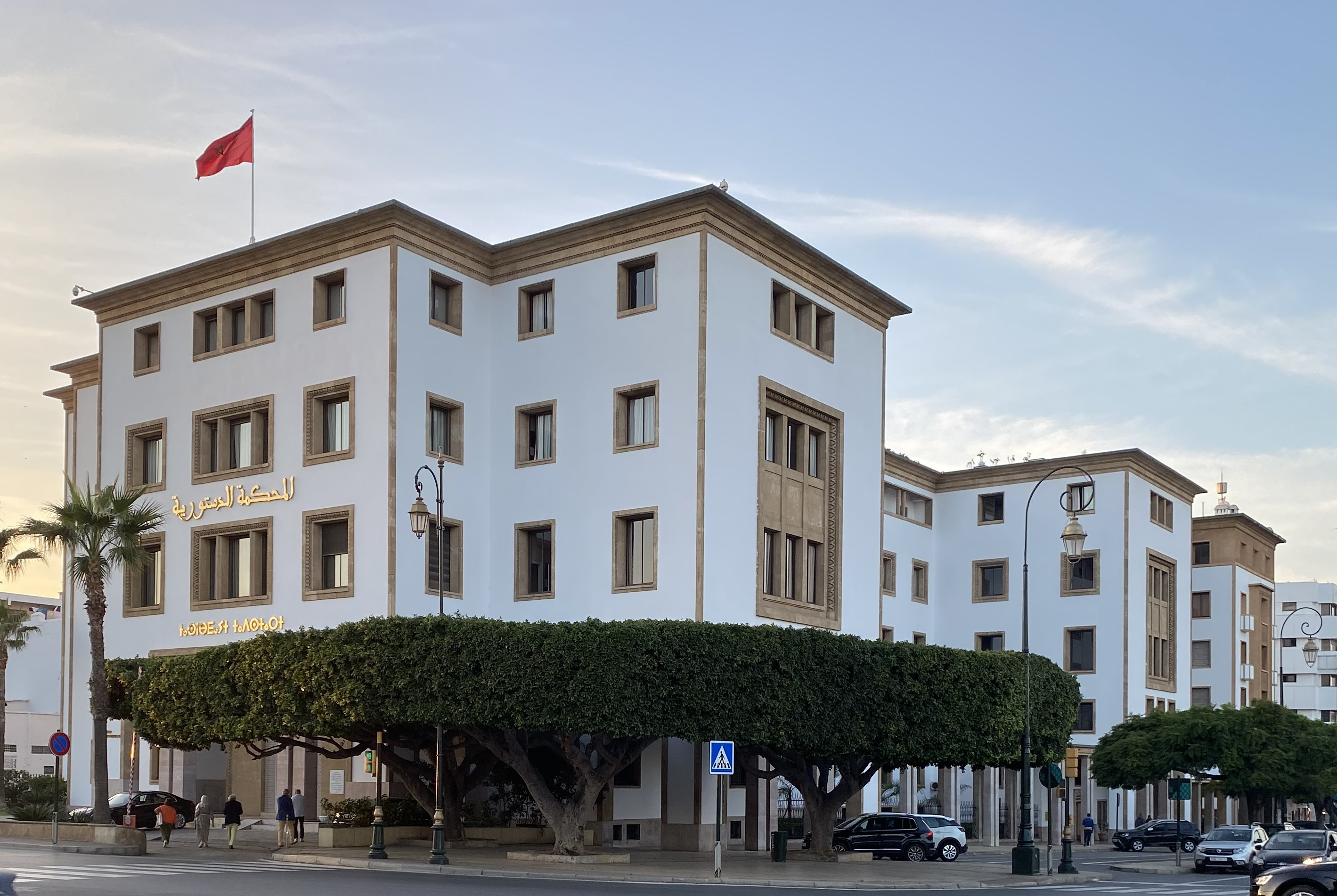
Constitutional Court

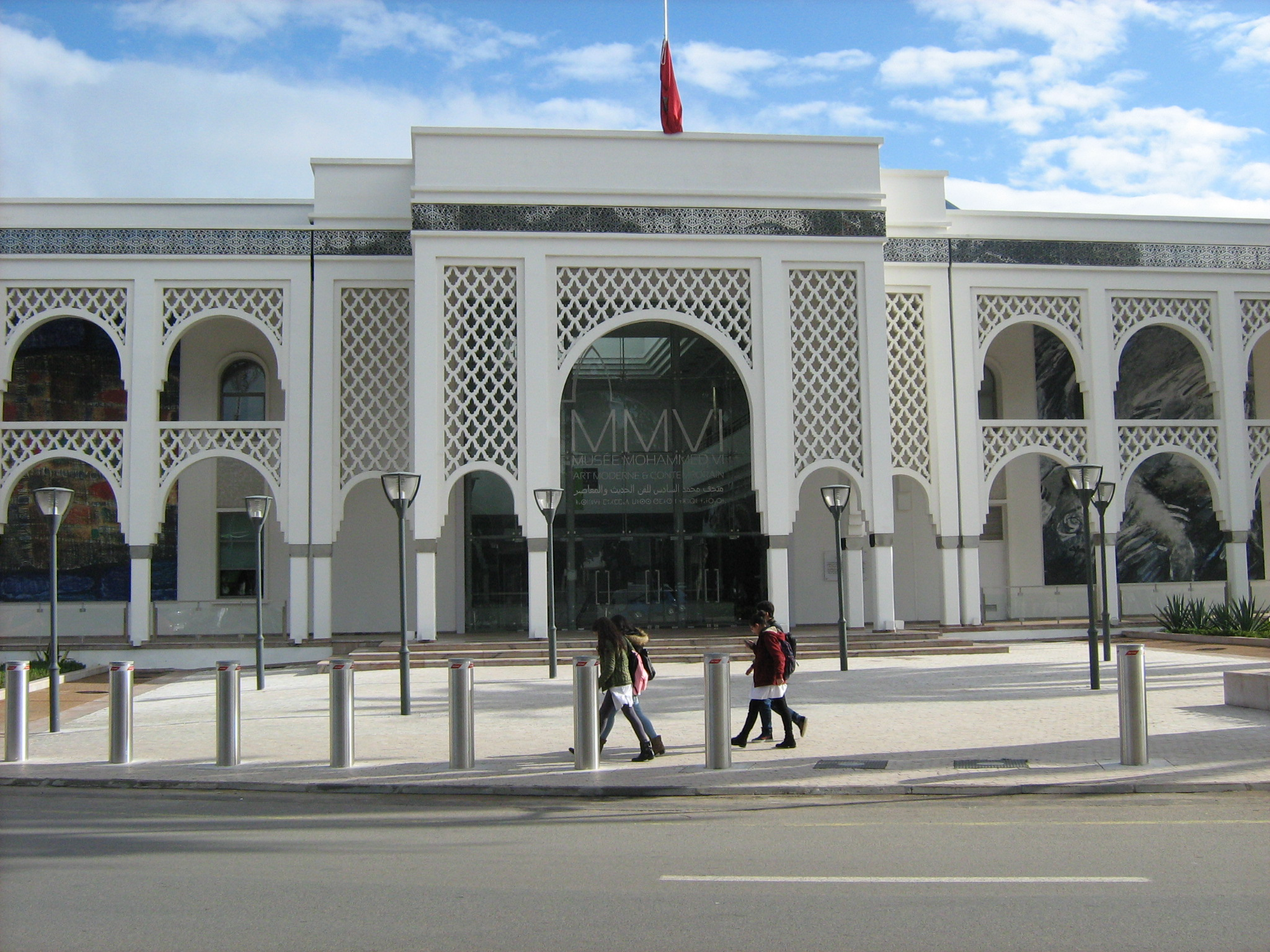
Mohammed VI Museum

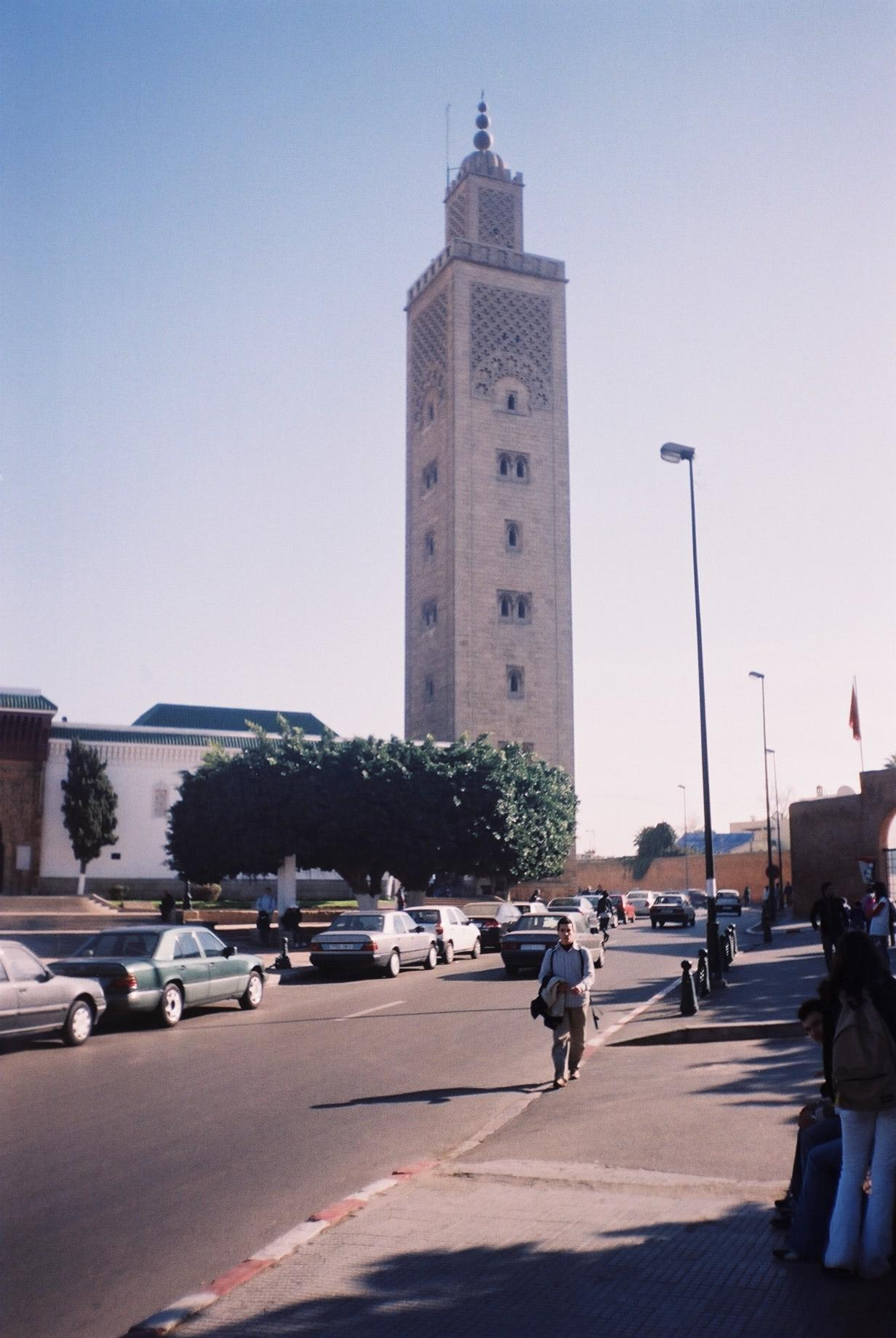
As-Sunnah Mosque

== See also ==
- Mohammed V Square in Casablanca
