= As-Sunna Mosque (Rabat) =

Mosque in Rabat, Morocco

- مسجد السنة
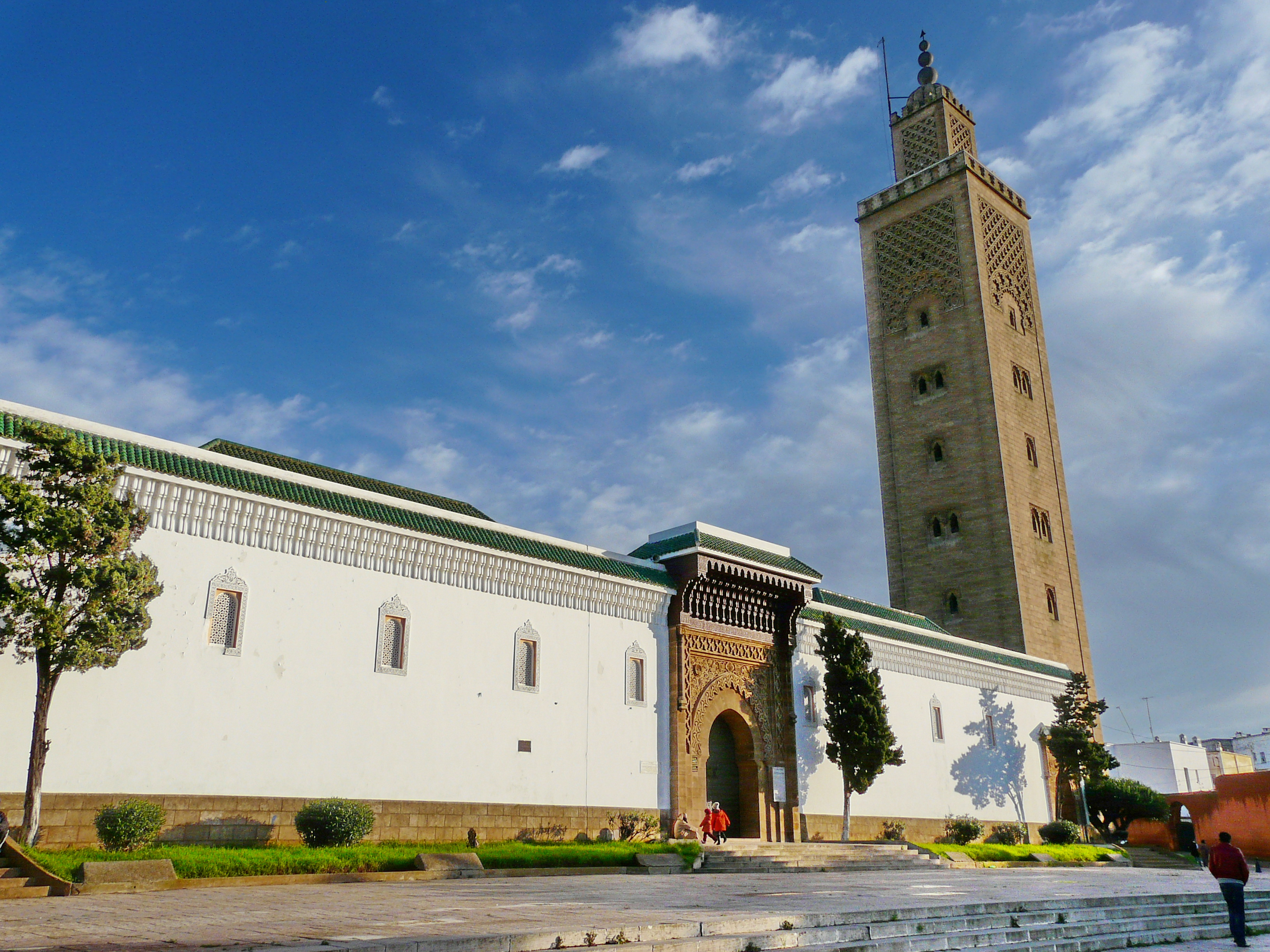
- The minaret of the mosque.

Religion
- Sect: (Maliki) Sunni

Location
- Location: Rabat, Morocco
- Interactive map of As-Sunna Mosque
- Coordinates: 34°0′47.9″N 6°49′58.6″W

Architecture
- Type: mosque
- Style: Alaouite, Moroccan, Islamic
- Founder: Sultan Moulay Mohammed ben Abdallah
- Completed: 1785 CE
- Minaret: 1

The As-Sunna Mosque or Assounna Mosque (among other similar spellings; Arabic: مسجد السنة, lit. 'Mosque of the Sunnah') is a large mosque in central Rabat, Morocco. It is one of the largest mosques in Morocco.

== History ==
The mosque was founded by the 'Alawi sultan Moulay Mohammed ben Abdallah (who briefly made Rabat his royal capital) and was completed in 1785. It was almost entirely rebuilt in the 19th century. In 1969, on the occasion of King Hassan II's 40th birthday, the mosque was renovated again and its minaret was moved from its original position at the northwest corner of the mosque and reconstructed "stone by stone" at the mosque's southwest corner, where it stands today, in order to enhance its perspective along the axis of Avenue Mohammed V.

== Architecture ==
The mosque occupies a visually prominent position on Avenue Mohammed V, one of the main boulevards of downtown Rabat. Just west and south of it is the Royal Palace. The building has a nearly square floor plan measuring roughly 74 meters per side with a surface area of 5565 metres, making it the fourth largest historic mosque in Morocco. It has a relatively standard layout for a Moroccan mosque, featuring a large rectangular courtyard (sahn) surrounded by galleries and a prayer hall consisting of three main transverse aisles running parallel to the qibla (southeastern) wall. At either end of the courtyard, aligned with the side entrances, are ornamental pavilions which recall a similar arrangement at the much older al-Qarawiyyin Mosque in Fes. The northern part of the mosque is occupied by additional rooms which once housed students. The minaret, featuring decorative motifs carved along its four facades, is located at the southwest corner but originally stood on its northwest corner. The mosque has multiple ornamental gateways and traditional Moroccan decoration inside.

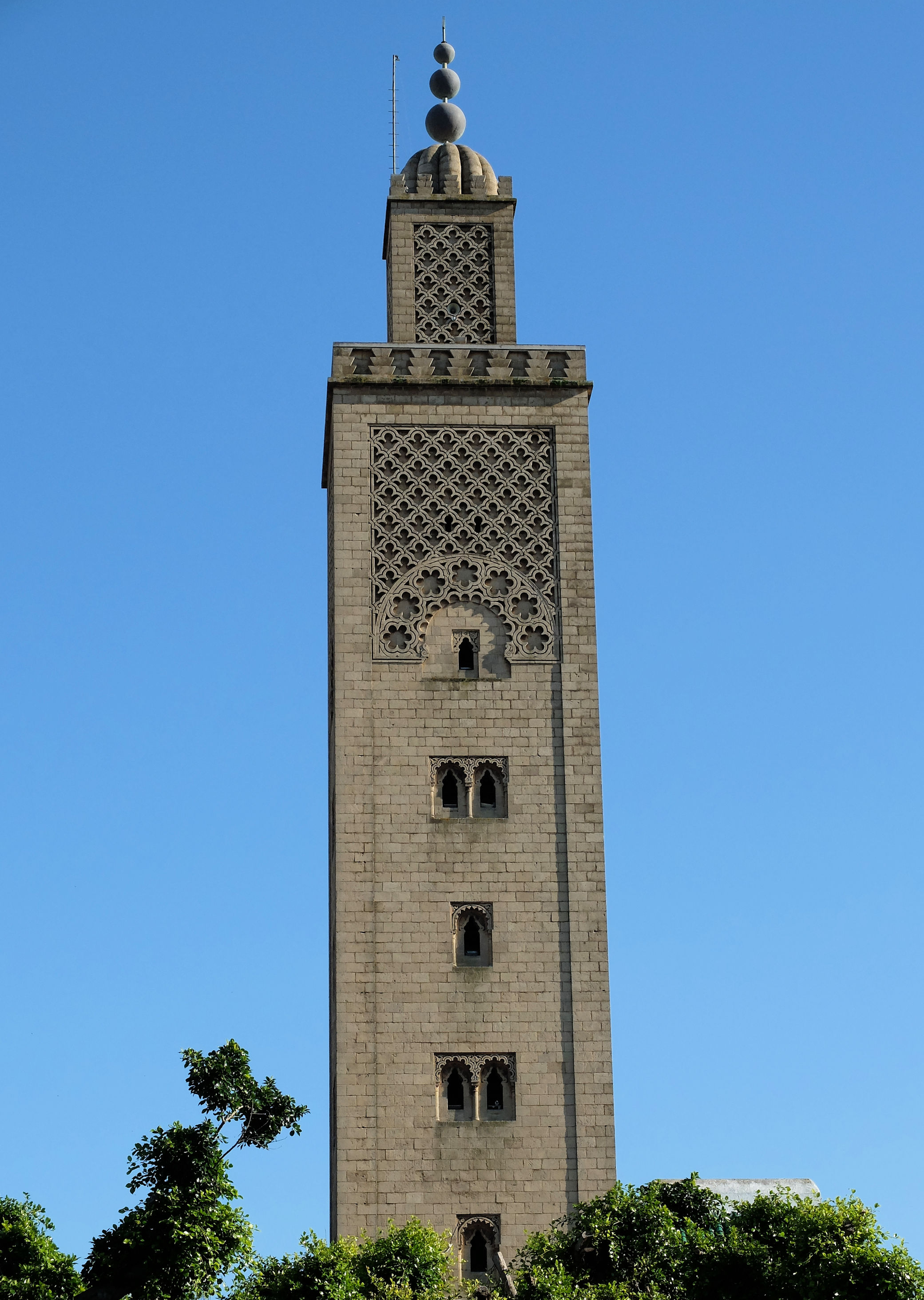
The minaret of the mosque.

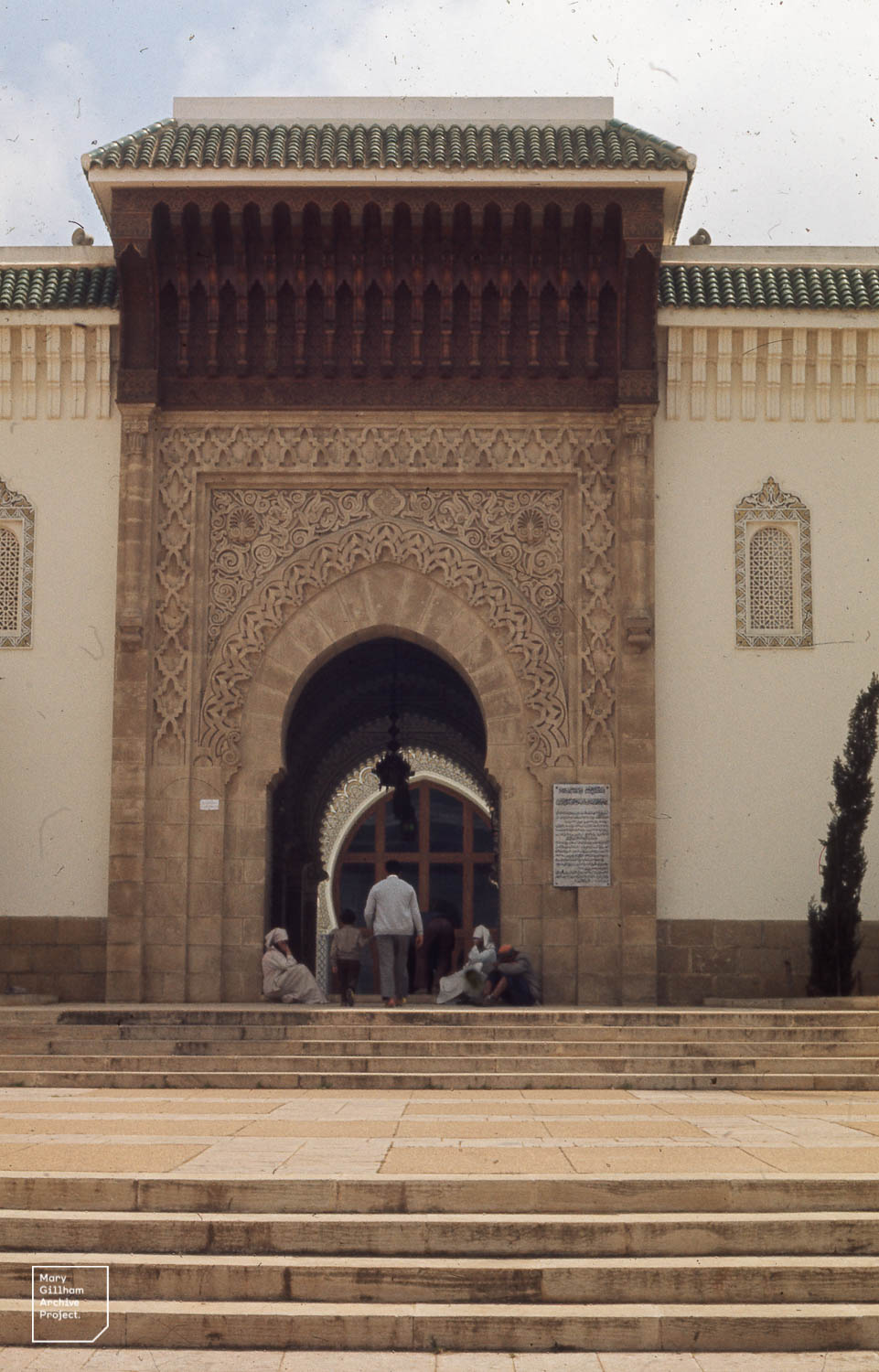
One of the mosque's main entrances.

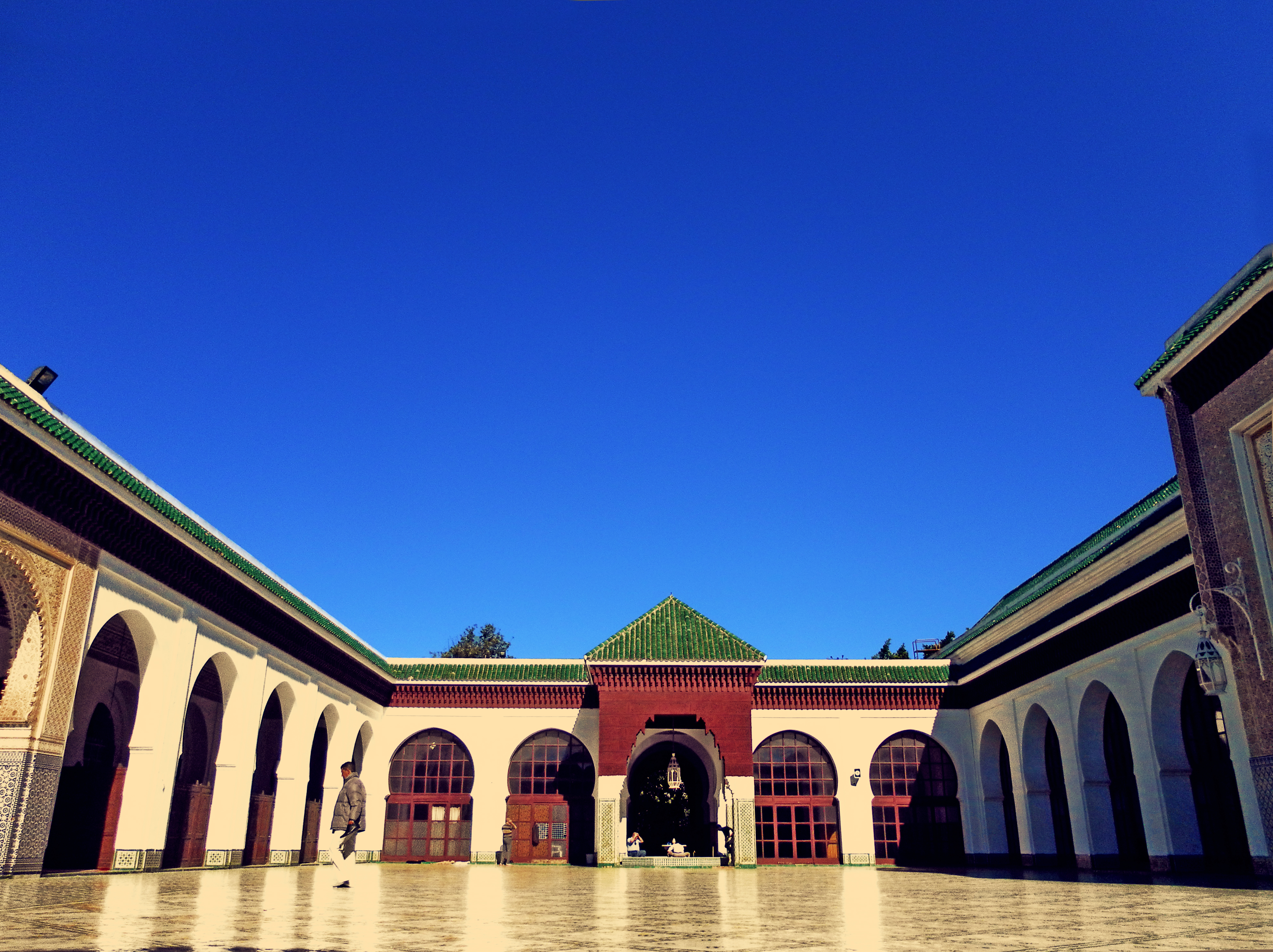
The courtyard of the mosque

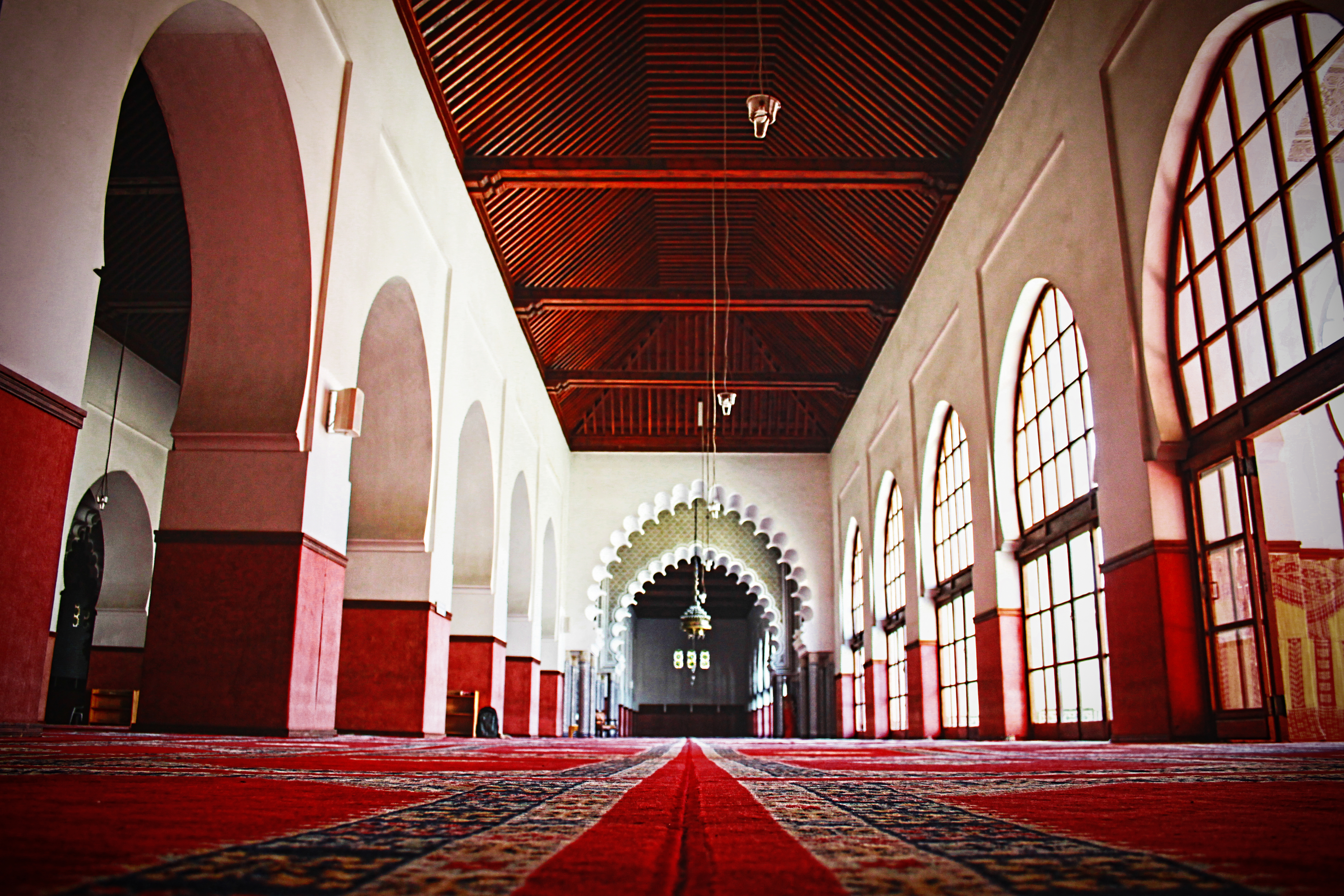
View inside the prayer hall

== See also ==
- List of mosques in Morocco
