= Borj Lalla Qadiya =

Moroccan cultural heritage site

- برج لالة قاضية (Arabic)
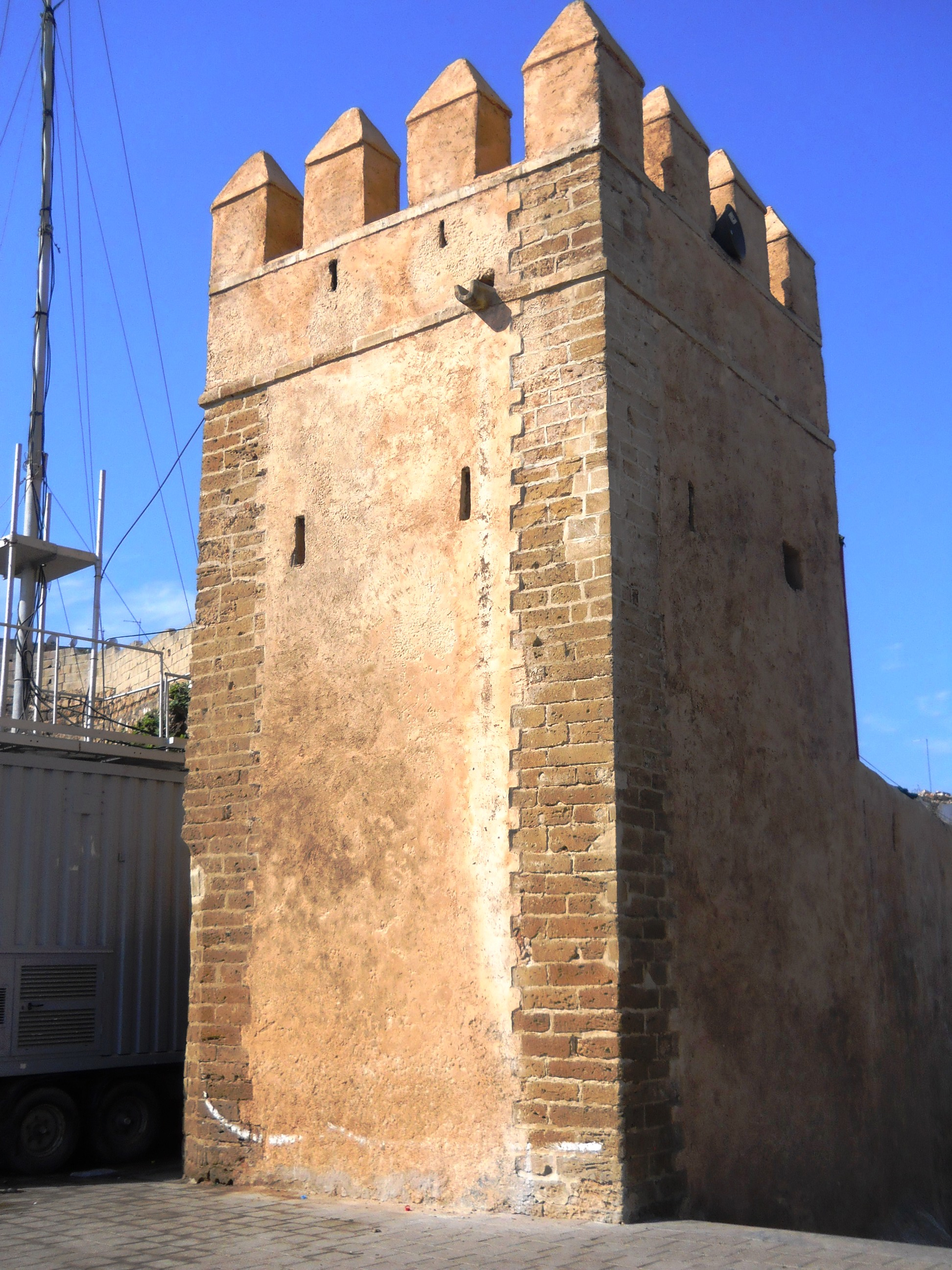

- Location within Morocco
- Type: Kasbah
- Location: Rabat, Morocco

History
- Built: probably 17th century

Site notes
- Architectural style: Moroccan Kasbah

Borj Lalla Qadiya (Arabic: برج لالة قاضية) is a fort in the city of Rabat, Morocco. It is believed to be first built in the 17th century next to the tomb of a saint woman called Lalla Qdiya. It forms an important part of the walls protecting the city from northeast.
