= Borj Sidi Makhlouf =

Moroccan cultural heritage site

- برج سيدي مخلوف (Arabic)
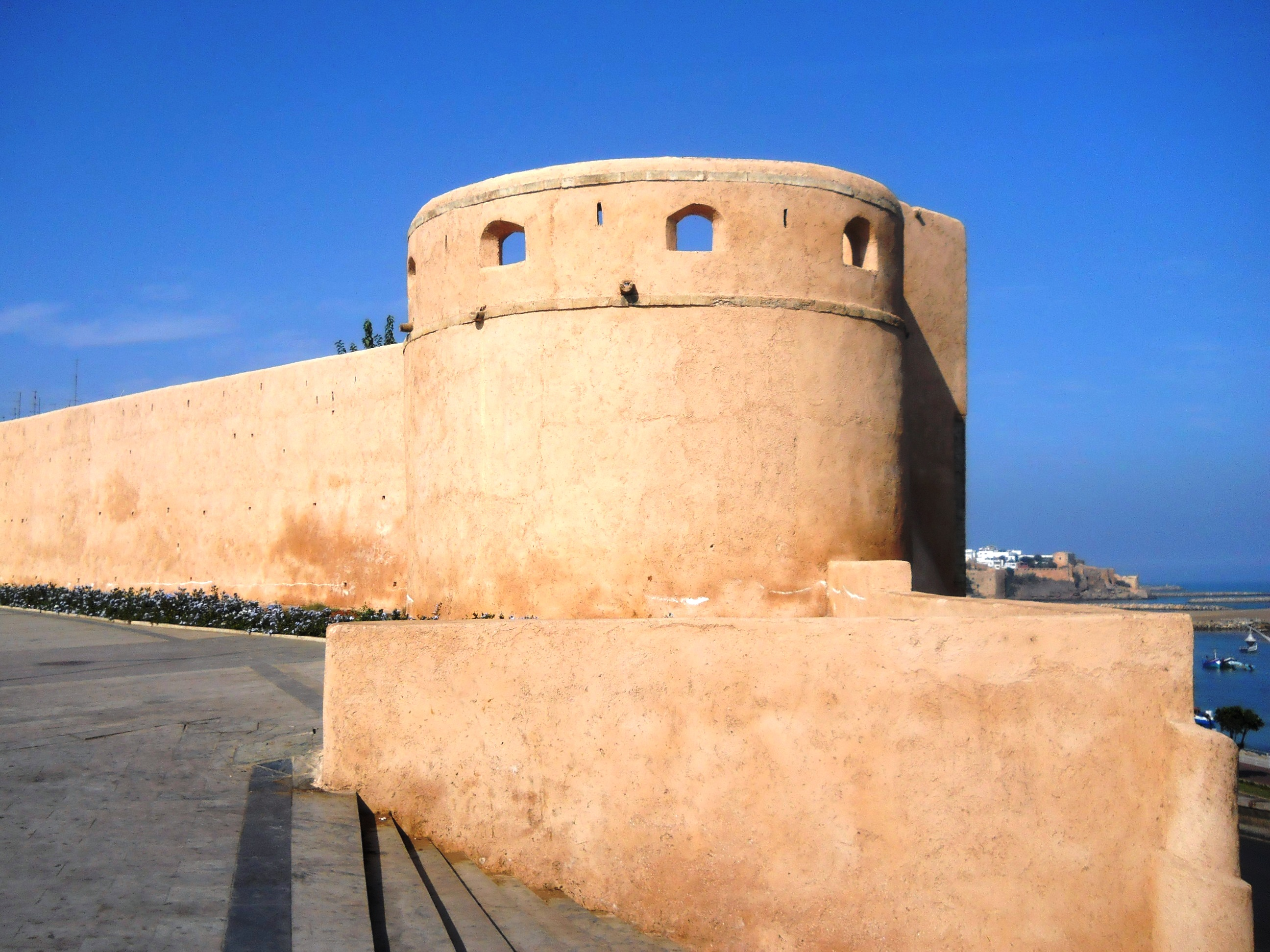

- Location within Morocco
- Type: Kasbah
- Location: Rabat, Morocco

History
- Built: 17th century

Site notes
- Architectural style: Moroccan Kasbah

Borj Sidi Makhlouf (Arabic: برج سيدي مخلوف) is a fort in the city of Rabat, Morocco. It was first established in the 17th century and was destroyed in 1637 but conserved its shape. It is located in the cliff of the Bouregreg river and marked the transition from Andalusian to military architecture.
