= Quartier l'Océan =

Quartier l'Océan is a neighborhood in Rabat, Morocco. In 2026 l'Océan was named the second coolest neighborhood on earth.
