= Moha ou Said =

Moroccan tribal leader who opposed French rule

Moha ou Said l'Irraoui
- Died: 5 March 1924
- Military career
- Service years: 1914–1924

Moha ou Said El Wirrawi (Central Atlas Tamazight: Muḥa u Sεid u-Wirraw; died 5 March 1924) was a Moroccan tribal leader who opposed French rule of the protectorate of Morocco. He formerly served as a caïd of the Moroccan sultans and fought for Sultan Abdelaziz against Bou Hmara in 1905. After the Treaty of Fes and the start of the French protectorate he opposed the French through military action. He participated in several battles with French forces in the Zaian War but was eventually forced into the High Atlas mountains where he died in action in 1924. His followers continued to resist the French over the next ten years.

== Early life ==
Moha was an Amghar (tribal chief) of his Berber tribe, the Ait Ouirra, before getting appointed as a local representative of authority in El-Ksiba by the caid of the Ait Ouirra, Ibn Hammu. After showing his competence and his commitment in subduing the revolting Berber tribes, he was appointed a caïd (a local governor with almost absolute power) for the Moroccan sultan, with responsibility for the Aït Seri Berber tribal confederation. As a caid he expanded his authority and included the Ait Oum El Bekht and Ait Ou Said Ou Ali tribes in his territory. He held Kasbah Tadla as his provincial capital. In 1905 he served in the army of Sultan Abdelaziz which fought against, Bou Hmara, a pretender based at Taza. After the start of the Hafidiya mouvement, he joined Abd al-Hafid knowing that Abdelaziz's rule would inevitably end.

== Opposition to French rule ==
Ou Said was described by the French as an "influential war chief" and was held in good standing by tribesmen across the Middle Atlas region. Together with Mouha ou Hammou Zayani, leader of the Zaian confederation and Ali Amhaouch, a Darqawa Islam religious leader, he formed the so-called "Berber trinity" which opposed French rule in the Middle Atlas through military action. Ou Said was initially open to a negotiated settlement with the French authorities but pressure from pro-war chiefs and the fear of ridicule from his tribesmen had forced his hand.

In February 1914 Ou Said attacked a French post established by Colonel Gueydon at Oued Zem, 25 miles (40 km) north-west of Kasbah Tadla. His attacks upon the post and its supply convoys led to Oued Zem becoming a focus of Moroccan resistance across the Middle Atlas. The French, led General Charles Mangin, managed to restore control locally but negotiations between Ou Said and Colonel Henri Simon did not bring peace. Mangin attacked Ou Said's camp at El Ksiba and, though the Berbers suffered heavy casualties, Ou Said's forces inflicted losses of 60 men killed and 150 wounded and captured much of their equipment.

== Zaian War ==
The French, under Resident-General Hubert Lyautey, launched the Zaian War in the Middle Atlas in mid-1914 against the Zaian Confederation of tribes. Early French gains were slowed by Ou Hammou's victory at the Battle of El Herri, support from the Central Powers and greater co-operation between Ou Said, Ou Hammou and Amahouch. Ou Said's troops, numbering up to 5,000 tribesmen, engaged General Noël Garnier-Duplessix' men at Sidi Sliman, near to Kasbah Tadla, in May 1915 but were heavily defeated, losing 300 killed and 400 wounded in exchange for three French dead and five wounded. This victory was a major setback for Ou Said, leading to his withdrawal further into the mountains and a six-month period of relative peace. He continued to fiercely resist the French and was helped by German military supplies, of which his troops received the most of all the tribes in Morocco.

Further Berber resistance continued through the course of the First World War, despite the death of Amhaouch in 1918, and the French found themselves still heavily opposed by the signing of the Armistice with Germany in November 1918. The Zaian war was eventually brought to a close in 1921 following the death of Ou Hammou and the submission of the remaining Zaian Confederation members. However, Ou Said continued his resistance, fleeing first to the Moulouya Valley and then to the highest mountains of the High Atlas after his defeat at the Battle of El Ksiba in April 1922 by General Joseph-François Poeymirau and Colonel Henry Freydenberg. He assigned the leadership of the Berber resistance to his son Bennacer and left for the kasbah that he built in Naour, where he remained until his death on 5 March 1924. Ou Said's followers continued their fight against the French until the final pacification of Morocco in 1934.

== See also ==
- Mhand n'Ifrutant

== Bibliography ==
- Bidwell, Robin Leonard (1973), Morocco Under Colonial Rule: French Administration Of Tribal Areas 1912–1956, Abingdon, UK: Frank Cass and Company, ISBN 0-7146-2877-8
- Bimberg, Edward L. (1999), The Moroccan Goums: Tribal Warriors in a Modern War, Westport, Connecticut: Greenwood Press, ISBN 0-313-30913-2
- Burke III, Edmund (1975), "Moroccan Resistance, Pan-Islam and German War Strategy, 1914–1918", Francia, 3: 434–464, archived from the original on 2019-01-29
- Fage, J.D.; Roberts, Andrew; Oliver, Roland Anthony (1986), The Cambridge History of Africa: From 1905 to 1940, Cambridge University Press, ISBN 0-521-22505-1
- Hoisington, William A (1995), Lyautey and the French Conquest of Morocco, New York: Macmillan:St Martin's Press, ISBN 0-312-12529-1
- Idrissi, Fakih (2005). "al-Wirrawi, Moha ou Said". In Toufiq, Ahmed; Hajji, Mohamed (eds.). Ma'lamat al-Maghrib (Encyclopedia of Morocco) (in Arabic). Vol. 22. al-Jamī‘a al-Maghribiyya li-l-Ta’līf wa-l-Tarjama wa-l-Nashr.
- Jaques, Tony (2007), Dictionary of Battles and Sieges: P-Z, Westport, Connecticut: Greenwood Press, ISBN 978-0-313-33537-2
- Porch, Douglas (1987), The Conquest of Morocco, London: Papermac, ISBN 978-0880640572
- Singer, Barnett; Langdon, John W. (2004), Cultured Force: Makers and Defenders of the French Colonial Empire, Madison: University of Wisconsin Press, ISBN 0-299-19900-2
- Usborne, Cecil Vivian (1936), The Conquest of Morocco, London: S. Paul & Co., OCLC 607919539
- Windrow, Martin (2010), Our Friends Beneath the Sands, London: Phoenix, ISBN 978-0-7538-2856-4
