= Mhand n'Ifrutant =

Moroccan military leader

Sidi Mhand n'Ifrutant was a Moroccan military leader active during the Zaian War.

N'Ifrutant's force of 1,500 tribesmen was engaged in battle on 9 August 1918 by French Colonel Paul Doury at Gaouz. As the French force entered a thickly vegetated oasis, n'Ifrutant's men attacked and, in a closely fought action, inflicted losses of 238 killed and 68 wounded - the worst losses since the Battle of El Herri in 1914. Doury's commander, Hubert Lyautey chastised him for his rash actions and failed to believe his report that he had "almost annihilated" n'Ifrutant's troops. French General Joseph-François Poeymirau defeated n'Ifrutant in battle at Meski on 15 January 1919, but was seriously wounded in the chest by the accidental explosion of an artillery shell and forced to hand command to Colonel Antoine Huré.

N'Ifrutant's tomb, in the lower valley of the Ragg river, was venerated by members of the Aït Atta tribe.

== See also ==
- Moha ou Said
- Mouha ou Hammou Zayani
- Ali Amhaouch
- Zaian confederation
- Zaian War
