= Ali Amhaouch =

Sidi Ali Amhaouch
- Born: 1844
- Died: 1918 (aged 73–74)

Sidi Ali ibn al-Mekki Amhaouch (1844–1918) was a Moroccan religious leader who opposed the French conquest of Morocco. Amhaouch was descended from a long line of marabouts who were influential religious figures in Morocco from 1715. Amhaouch backed two rebellions against the Moroccan government and later fought against the French occupying forces. He declared a defensive jihad against France during the Zaian War but died of natural causes in 1918, three years before the war ended in the tribesmen's defeat. His son, Sidi El Mekki Amhaouch, continued to fight the French until his defeat in 1932. Amhaouch's descendant is a religious leader in modern-day Morocco.

== Early life ==
Amhaouch was a member of the Imhiwach, a dynasty of marabouts that dominated central Morocco from around 1715 to 1932. The Imhawch were renowned for their "Koranic-inspired teaching, magic rites and doomsday prophecies". A member of the same family was responsible for the capturing of Sultan Mulay Slimane in May 1819.

Ali Amhaouch was born in 1844 and became widely known as a religious figure, of the Darqawa sufi order, who commanded respect across Morocco and was one of the few people capable of bringing peace to warring tribes. He made his own prophecies and considered the Jbel Toujjit mountain, the source of the Moulouya River, to be a sacred site. Amhaouch supported the Ait Sukhman tribe against the rival Zaian Confederation in intermittent warfare lasting from 1877 to 1909. Amhaouch was also a key backer of Si Mhand Laârbi, a member of the Alaouite dynasty, against Moroccan government forces in the 1880s. Laârbi's men were able to defeat a force commanded by Moulay Srou, the uncle of Sultan Hassan I, in battle in 1888.

== Interaction with the French ==
Amhaouch met with the French explorer René de Segonzac in 1904-5 and gave him documents detailing the mountains and tribes of Aghbala and also a Tamazight prophecy. The prophecy was written in the 12th century of Islam (approx 1700s) by Amhaouch's great uncle, Bou Beker, and was said to foretell the 1888 victory over Sultan Hassan. Segonzac later described Amhaouch as a strong and influential man, one of the "great spiritual leaders of Morocco" and the "most powerful religious personality of the south east". Amhaouch supported another revolt against the Moroccan sultan in 1908, leading troops of the Melwiya to join the uprising led by Moulay Lahssen el Sabaâ in the east of the country until forced to return home due to Sabaâ's defeat at the hands of the French troops in Menhaba and Boudenib.

Following the declaration of the French protectorate over Morocco after the signing of the Treaty of Fes in 1912 French troops began occupying the inland portion of Morocco. Following the 1914 fall of Khenifra, he joined forces with his former enemy, Mouha ou Hammou Zayani (leader of the Zaian Confederation), and tribal leader Moha ou Said to form a "powerful Berber trinity" that contested the Zaian War against the French. Amhaouch declared a defensive jihad against the French upon the outbreak of the First World War. This extended from the Dadès Gorges to the desert beyond the Anti-Atlas mountains and was part of a plan to exploit the withdrawal of French troops from Morocco for the defence of France. Amhaouch's men were engaged and defeated by French columns commanded by Colonels Noël Garnier-Duplessix and Henri Claudel in late 1914. Amhaouch himself died of natural causes in 1918. Hammou and Said continued to fight the French and, though they lost the Zaian War in 1921, pacification of Morocco was not completed until 1934 - years after their deaths.

Amhaouch's eldest son, Sidi Lmekki Amhaouch, who was said to have inherited a magical rifle cartridge from his father, also fought against the French. In August/September 1932 he held out for more than a month with just 1,000 tribesmen against two French columns. Amhaouch's descendant, Sidi Mohand Amhaouch, is a religious leader in modern Morocco.

O jackal of Anergui, and you, companion of Mourik, carry yourselves to Tafza; contemplate the fire raging there!

— A prophecy of apocalypse attributed to Amhaouch.
