= Joseph Dérigoin =

French army officer

- Military career
- Allegiance: France
- Branch: French Army
- Rank: Colonel
- Conflicts: Occupation of Madagascar; Zaian War; First World War

Colonel Joseph Dérigoin was a French army officer. He served as a lieutenant with the French Foreign Legion in the occupation of Madagascar, distinguishing himself in an attack on a Malagasy fortification. He later rose to command a French column during the Zaian War in Morocco and served as a colonel in the First World War.

== Madagascar ==
Dérigoin served with the French Foreign Legion and as a lieutenant was present at the Battle of Nosibe in Madagascar on 6 February 1897 during the French occupation of that country. Alongside Captain Flayelle and Adjutant Géré he led the storming of the Malagasy fortification by climbing over a gate by use of a ladder. The Malagasy were defeated within a few hours and the French took 3,000 prisoners during the following two days. During his time in Madagascar Dérigoin had command of 60 men in one platoon of legion. On another occasion, working again with Flayelle, on the road between Ambohidratrimo and Beparasy Dérigoin and his men took 50 prisoners and captured several rifles whilst raiding a village in a forest as Flayelle destroyed the camp of a rebel chief.

== Morocco and later service ==
During the Zaian War in Morocco Dérigoin, by then a lieutenant-colonel, commanded a groupe mobile (mobile column of mixed arms troops), formed at Ito in the aftermath of the heavy French defeat at the Battle of El Herri, that left the strategically important town of Khénifra almost unguarded. Dérigoin's group was largely based around the 6th battalion of the 2nd Foreign Infantry Regiment of the French Foreign Legion. On 18 November, just five days after the battle, Dérigoin's groupe mobile reached Khénifra, along with General Paul Prosper Henrys, after a 50-mile (80 km) march across country. Dérigoin's legionnaires marched to the battlefield of El Herri on 19 November to bury the bodies of the 623 French dead.

Later promoted to colonel Dérigoin served in the First World War, fighting in battle alongside French zouaves against the German Guards Corps.
