= Maurice Le Glay =

French Army officer and author (1868–1936)

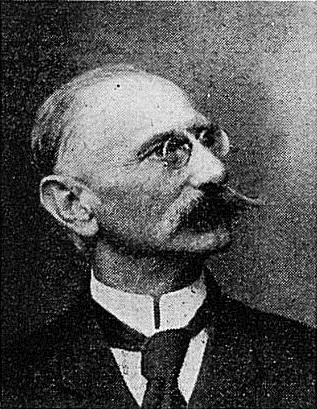
- Le Glay photographed in the early 1920s
- Born: 1868; Bordeaux, France
- Died: 3 April 1936 (aged 67–68); Casablanca, Morocco
- Military career
- Allegiance: France
- Branch: French Army
- Service years: 1887/8–1918
- Conflicts: Zaian War

Maurice Le Glay (1868 – 3 April 1936) was a French Army officer and author of works on Morocco. He served as an artillery and political officer in Algeria, Tunisia and Morocco before retiring to a civil post in 1918 so that he could begin a literary career. He wrote numerous journal articles and several books including a description of the French defeat at the Battle of El Herri. He was a strong admirer of the Berber people, though he was criticised for inspiring the political division of the Berber and Arab peoples in Morocco. He retired to Casablanca, where he died and was honoured with a street named in his memory.

== Military career ==
Maurice Le Glay was born in Bordeaux in 1868. At the age of 19, he enlisted in the French Army. He studied as an officer-cadet at the School of Artillery and Engineering in Fontainebleau and, after being commissioned as an officer, served with the army in Algeria and Tunisia. By 1909 he had become a Captain and was posted to Morocco for the first time. He was part of the military mission responsible for overseeing the army of the Moroccan Sultan. He took part in the Zaian War against the Berbers to bring French rule to the Middle Atlas, fighting alongside Moroccan goumiers and serving as General Hubert Lyautey's political officer (advisor on relations with the Moroccan people).

== Literary career ==
Le Glay left the army in 1918 and became the civil controller of Safi, intending to pursue a literary career. His sketches and stories of Morocco quickly became famous and one of his stories became the inspiration for the 1934 film, Itto. In Les Sentiers de la Guerre et le Famour he tells the story of the French defeat at the Battle of El Herri in the Zaian War and praises the leadership skills of Mouha ou Hammou Zayani. He is also known for his compelling writing in Marocains de la Plaine et des Monts. He had numerous articles published in journals such as La Vigie Marocaine and the Bulletin de Fenseignement Public. Le Glay inspired and was patron of a number of other authors on Moroccan life including Moses Nahon, Thomas Lonie, Said Guennoun, René Eulogius and Henri Duquaire.

Le Glay's writings have been criticised for inspiring political division between the Berbers and the Arabs in Morocco, though he welcomed the unification of Morocco. He was an admirer of the Berber culture and noted that they "believe that laborious freedom is preferable to comfortable slavery. On the high plateaus and highest mountains of central Morocco they have lived in their own way for centuries. These are people who are unfamiliar with comfort and government. They call themselves free men and speak a crude language known to them as Tamazirt and to us as Berber. They are independent to the point of anarchy." Le Glay retired to Casablanca where he died on 3 April 1936. A street in that city is named after him.

== Publications ==
- Récits marocains de la plaine et des monts (Moroccan tales of the plains and the mountains), Paris, Berger-Levrault, 1921 (winner of a Grand Prix de Littérature Coloniale in 1922).
- Badda, fille berbère et autres récits (Badda, the Berber girl, and other tales), Paris, Plon-Nourrit, 1921 (winner of a Grand Prix de Littérature Coloniale in 1922).
- Le chat aux oreilles percées (roman) (The cat with pierced ears (novel)), Paris, Plon-Nourrit, 1922.
- Itto, récit marocain d'amour et de bataille (Itto, a Moroccan tale of love and battle), Paris, Plon, 1923.
- La mort du Rogui (Histoire du Sultan Moulay Hafid, de son gouvernement, des Européens de Fez en 1910) (The death of Rogui (The history of Sultan Moulay Hafid, his government, and Europeans in Fez in 1910)), Paris, Berger-Levrault, 1926.
- Les pasteurs (Ichou et Itto, enfants berbères) (The pastors (Ichou and Itto, Berber children), Paris, Berger-Levrault, 1929; Originally published in the magazine France-Maroc in March 1922.
- Les sentiers de la guerre et de l'amour, récits marocains (The paths of war and love, Moroccan tales), Paris, Berger-Levrault, 1930.
- Trois Récits marocains (illustrés par Abascal), 150 exemplaires (Three Moroccan tales (illustrated by Abascal), 150 copies), Les Bibliophiles du Maroc, Casablanca, 1930.
- Nouveaux récits marocains de la plaine et des monts (New Moroccan tales of the plains and the mountains), Paris, Berger-Levrault, 1932.
- Chronique marocaine (Année 1911 jusqu'à l'arrivée des Français à Fez) (Moroccan chronicle (from 1911 until the arrival of the French in Fez)), Paris, Berger-Levrault, 1933.
