= Lehri, Morocco =

Lehri لهري ⵍⵀⵔⵉ
- commune
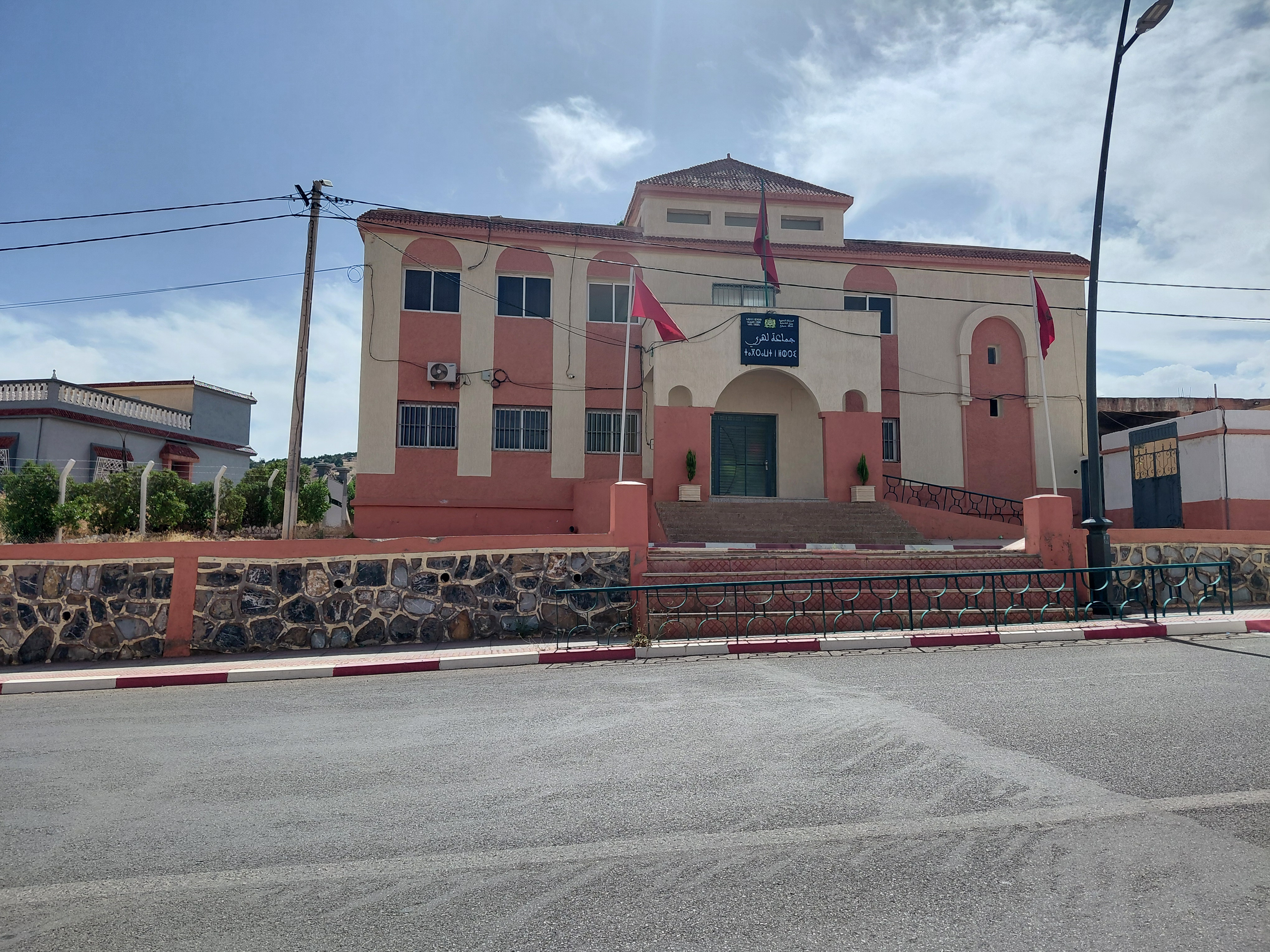
- Interactive map of Lehri
- Coordinates: 32.8580°N 5.6254°W
- Country: Morocco
- Region: Béni Mellal-Khénifra
- Province: Khénifra

Population (2004)
  - Total: 9,424
- Time zone: UTC+0 (GMT)

Lehri (Arabic: لهري), also spelled El Herri, is a commune in Khénifra Province, Béni Mellal-Khénifra, Morocco. At the time of the 2004 census, the commune had a total population of 9424 people living in 1641 households.

Lehri was the location of the famous 1914 battle of El Herri between French and Zayanes troops.
