= Meski =

Coordinates: 31°53′N 4°16′W

- Interactive map of Meski
- Country: Morocco
- Region: Drâa-Tafilalet
- Province: Errachidia
- Time zone: UTC+0 (GMT)

Meski is a small town in Errachidia Province in the Drâa-Tafilalet region of Morocco. It has fewer than 1,000 inhabitants.

It was the location of a battle between French and Berber forces in the Zaian War on 15 January 1919 where General Joseph-François Poeymirau defeated Sidi Mhand n'Ifrutant.
