= Henri Simon =

French army officer

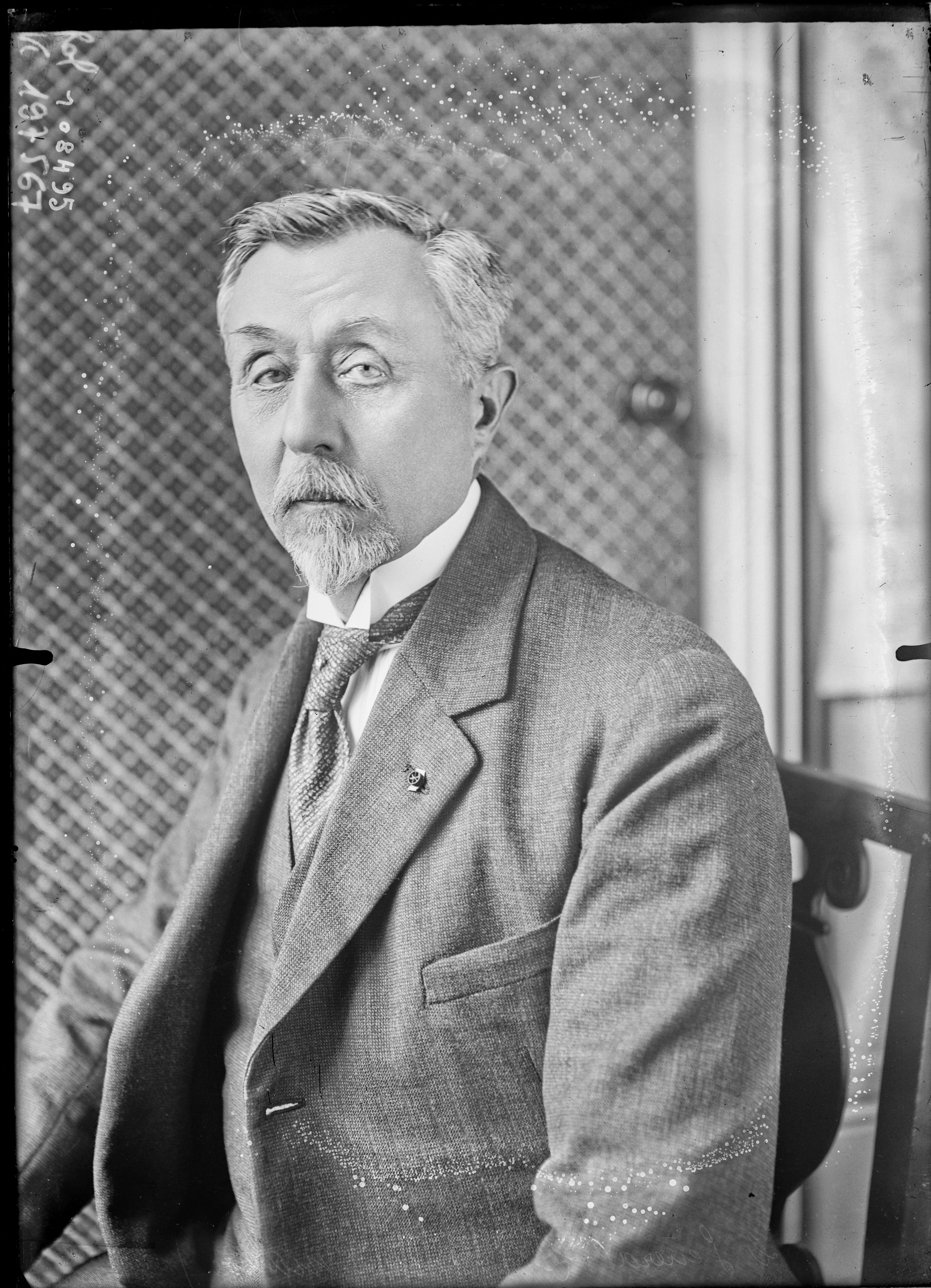
- Born: 23 February 1866
- Died: 15 May 1956 (aged 90)
- Military career
- Allegiance: France
- Branch: French Army
- Rank: Général de Division

General Henri Joseph Simon (23 February 1866 – 15 May 1956) was a French army officer. He is particularly associated with the French protectorate of Morocco where he spent much of his army career. Simon served as head of intelligence to Hubert Lyautey and as director of the Moroccan Indigenous Affairs Service as well as conventional combat roles. He later wrote books about his time in Morocco and helped the production of the 1934 film Itto.

== Morocco ==
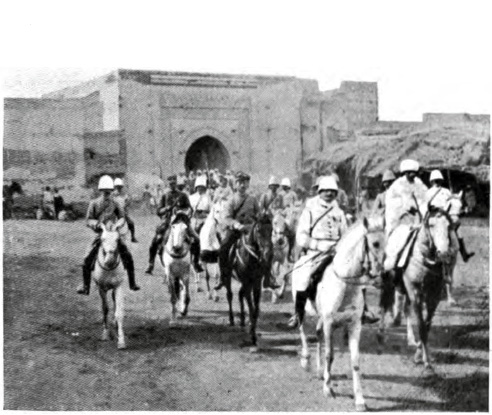
Charles Mangin enters Marrakesh after its capture by Simon

Simon was born on 23 February 1866 at Sélestat in the Bas-Rhin department of Alsace. As a captain Simon was attached to the native affairs office of Algeria and was appointed a chevalier of the Legion of Honour on 11 July 1903.

As a Chef de bataillon (major) he was with the 116th Infantry Regiment in Casablanca on 30 December 1911 when he was appointed an officer of the Legion of Honour.

He was given command of the irregular Moroccan Goumiers in French service in 1911. An initially temporary arrangement Simon provided such "good service" that his superior, Colonel Pein, called them "the marvel and revelation of this campaign" and they were expanded and integrated as a permanent part of the French armed forces. By 1912 Simon had been promoted to Colonel and, under the command of Colonel Charles Mangin, fought against an anti-French rebellion by the self-proclaimed Sultan Ahmed al-Hiba. After the Battle of Sidi Bou Othman Simon lead a column of French troops to Marrakesh to rescue European hostages held there and swiftly brought the rebellion to an end. In 1913 he was placed in charge of the Moroccan Native Affairs service and, fighting successfully alongside Mangin in Western Morocco, he was given command of the Oued Zem sector. During the Zaian War of 1914-21 Simon served as General Hubert Lyautey's head of intelligence. Simon later became director of the Indigenous Affairs Service of Morocco and was a member of the Rabat Berber Studies Committee from its establishment in 1915. On 14 April 1917 Simon was appointed an officer of the Legion of Honour, at which point he was commanding an infantry brigade on the German front. On 7 February 1918 Simon was appointed commanding officer of the 73rd Infantry Brigade, transferring to the 33rd brigade on 6 June and to the 334th brigade on 28 May 1919. Simon commanded the 154th Infantry brigade from 12 September, the 255th from 11 December 1922 and was promoted to command the 77th Infantry division on 10 April 1923.

Simon was a Général de Brigade and commanded the French "bridgehead" at Düsseldorf, Germany on 12 July 1923 when he was appointed grand officer of the Legion of Honour. Simon became a grand cross of the Legion of Honour on 11 July 1928 at which point he was general commanding the 11th Infantry Division.

== Later life ==
Simon later became a writer, publishing Un officier d'Afrique: le commandant Verlet-Hanus: mission saharienne, pacification marocaine (1898-1912) (An Officer in Africa: Commandant Verlet-Hanus: Saharan Mission, Moroccan Pacification) in 1930 regarding his time in Morocco and also Pacification du Rif : soumission d'Abd el Krim (Pacification of the Rif : Submission of Abd el Krim) regarding the Rif War. He was also involved with the production of the 1934 film Itto, filmed in Morocco and written by fellow soldier Maurice Le Glay. Simon died on 15 May 1956.
