= Jean Théveney =

French general

- Born: 5 November 1866; Tarascon, Bouches-du-Rhône, France
- Died: 7 January 1960 (aged 93)
- Military career
- Allegiance: France
- Branch: French Army
- Service years: 1884–1935
- Rank: Général de Brigade
- Conflicts: Zaian War; First World War
- Awards: Legion of Honor, GO 1935; Croix de Guerre

General Jean Baptiste Philippe Théveney (in some works spelt "Théveny") (5 November 1866 – 7 January 1960) was a French army officer. His father was a cavalry officer and Théveney was educated at the Ecole Spéciale Militaire de Infanterie before being commissioned as an infantry officer. He served in a number of staff and regimental appointments in France before joining the 1st Foreign Regiment of the French Foreign Legion and seeing active service in Algeria. Théveney followed the regiment to Morocco where it was involved in the Zaian War against the Berbers.

Théveney spent much of his military career in Morocco, fighting in many battles and being mentioned in dispatches several times. He served briefly against the German Army on the Western Front before returning to Morocco within a year. He led the operation that brought to an end the Zaian War in 1921 and remained in Morocco, participating in the Rif War in 1926. Théveney was a grand-officer of the Legion of Honour and holder of the Croix de Guerre and the Spanish Moroccan Peace Medal.

== Early life ==
Théveney was born at 05.00 on 5 November 1866 in Tarascon, Bouches-du-Rhône in France. His father was the then 29-year-old Ernest Théveney, a chevalier of the Legion of Honour and first lieutenant in the 1st Regiment of Lancers and his mother was 34-year-old Hyacinthe Léonille Allard, wife of Ernest. He was named after his maternal grandfather Jean Baptiste Allard. Jean Baptiste Théveney married Marie Thérése Berthe Coudere on 26 December 1887, they had no children.

== Initial military career ==
On 30 October 1884 he volunteered for service in the French Army and was accepted as an officer-candidate at the Ecole Spéciale Militaire de Infanterie. On 1 April 1885 he was promoted to 1st class officer-candidate, then corporal on 22 August and sergeant on 3 November. Théveney left the Ecole on 1 October 1886 and was commissioned as a sub-lieutenant in the 63rd Infantry Regiment. He was promoted to lieutenant in that regiment on 12 July 1890 and to first lieutenant on 5 October 1892. Théveney was promoted to captain on 11 July 1896 and transferred to the 105th Infantry Regiment. He became a staff officer with the XIII Corps on 3 February 1897 and returned to the infantry on 9 April 1903 when he joined the 121st Infantry Regiment. From 11 July 1905 he was aide de camp of the 18th Brigade and then, from 25 December 1906, that of the 10th Division. Théveney studied at the staff college from 16 November 1907 until posted to the 63rd Infantry Regiment on 24 October 1908.

Théveney was promoted to chef de bataillon (roughly equivalent to major) of the 50th Infantry Regiment on 25 December 1908. He transferred to the 47th Infantry Regiment on 24 June 1909; the 9th Infantry Regiment on 25 September 1909 and the 24th Infantry Regiment on 25 January 1910. On 29 December 1910 Théveney was appointed chevalier of the Legion of Honour. He returned to the 1st Infantry Division as a staff officer on 23 February 1912 and on 26 April 1913 was appointed chef du bataillon in the 1st Foreign Regiment of the French Foreign Legion, seeing active service in Algeria from 17 May 1913.

== Zaian War ==
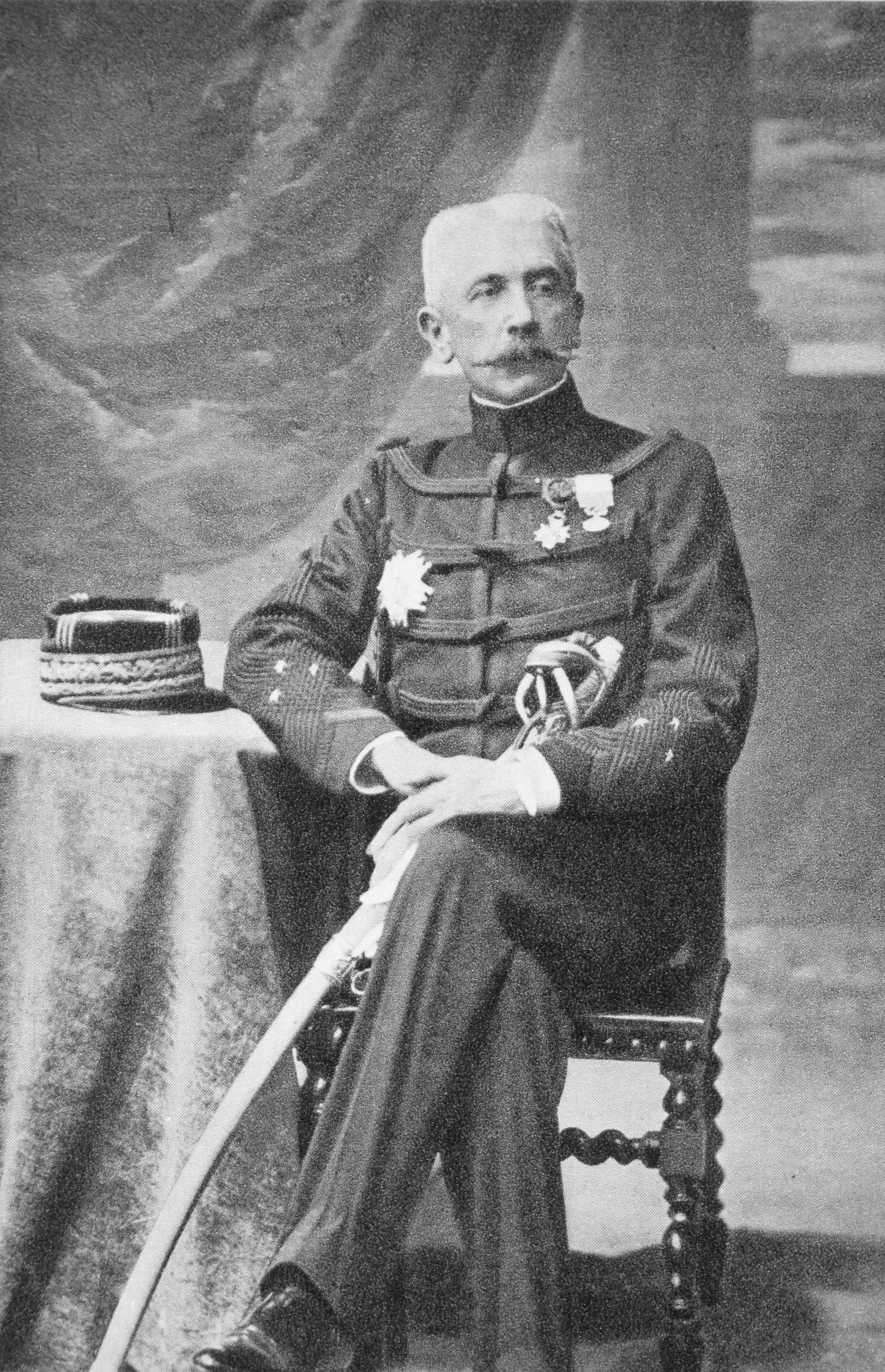
General Hubert Lyautey

On 22 February 1915 Théveney was promoted to lieutenant-colonel and assumed command of the Foreign Legion's 1st Marching Regiment. The regiment was transferred to Morocco on 15 May and took part in the Zaian War against Berber tribesmen opposed to the French protectorate. Théveney was appointed commander of the Sultan of Morocco's Order of Ouissam Alaouite on 8 August 1915. On 19 December 1915 he assumed command of the Fes groupe mobile (a mobile combined arms unit unique to Morocco). He was mentioned in dispatches on 7 August 1916 for his bravery and endurance in this command, achieving "brilliant" results on campaign despite the poor terrain and heavy enemy fire.

Théveney transferred to fight the Germans on the Western Front on 6 January 1917, taking command of the 408th Infantry Regiment on 20 January. He was mentioned in dispatches again (on 25 August 1917) for his effective leadership of that unit during French offensives made within days of his assumption of command. Théveney's work was recognised with his appointment as an officer of the Legion of Honour on 14 April 1917. He returned to Morocco on 20 July 1917.

Resident-General Hubert Lyautey soon promoted Théveney to colonel and placed him in command of the Tadla-Zaian territory. He was soon commended again, mentioned in dispatches on 20 December 1917 for his defence of the Rhorm El Alem post, in which he repelled two fierce assaults with minimal losses and displayed calmness under fire. Théveney took command of the Meknes military subdivision on 28 January 1918 before taking control of the Fes subdivision on 13 April 1919. He returned to the Tadla-Zaian command on 6 August and was again mentioned in dispatches (on 30 November 1919) for operations from 5 to 7 October in which he commanded an ad hoc formation of troops attempting to resupply Khénifra and was opposed by numbers of the Ait Affi tribe which he defeated comprehensively. Théveney was mentioned in dispatches again in March 1921 for establishing effective French control of the front extending from Zafan to El Bordj during a 7-month campaign in which he was said to exhibit superb military skill. Lyautey ascribed a large portion of the success on the Zafan front in 1920 to Théveney. He was promoted to général de brigade on 2 April 1921 and, returning to the Fes command on 15 July, subsequently led a French column which eliminated the last pocket of resistance in the Tadla-Zaian and brought about the end of the Zaian War.

== Subsequent career ==
Théveney was appointed commander of the Legion of Honour on 12 July 1923. He was once more mentioned in dispatches on 28 July 1923 as commander of the Meknes subdivision for his work in the Spring offensive in the Moulouya Valley. He was praised for his men's fast marching, which enabled them to drive the enemy before them. He participated in the Rif War in northern Morocco as commander of a division and again was mentioned in dispatches, on 5 September 1926, for his cool-headedness and expert knowledge of African warfare. Théveney was appointed grand-officer of the Legion of Honour on 25 December 1935 by recommendation of the Minister of War, at which point he had ceased active service and was in the army reserve. Théveney also held the Croix de Guerre and the Spanish Moroccan Peace Medal. He died on 7 January 1960.
