= Henry Freydenberg =

French army officer

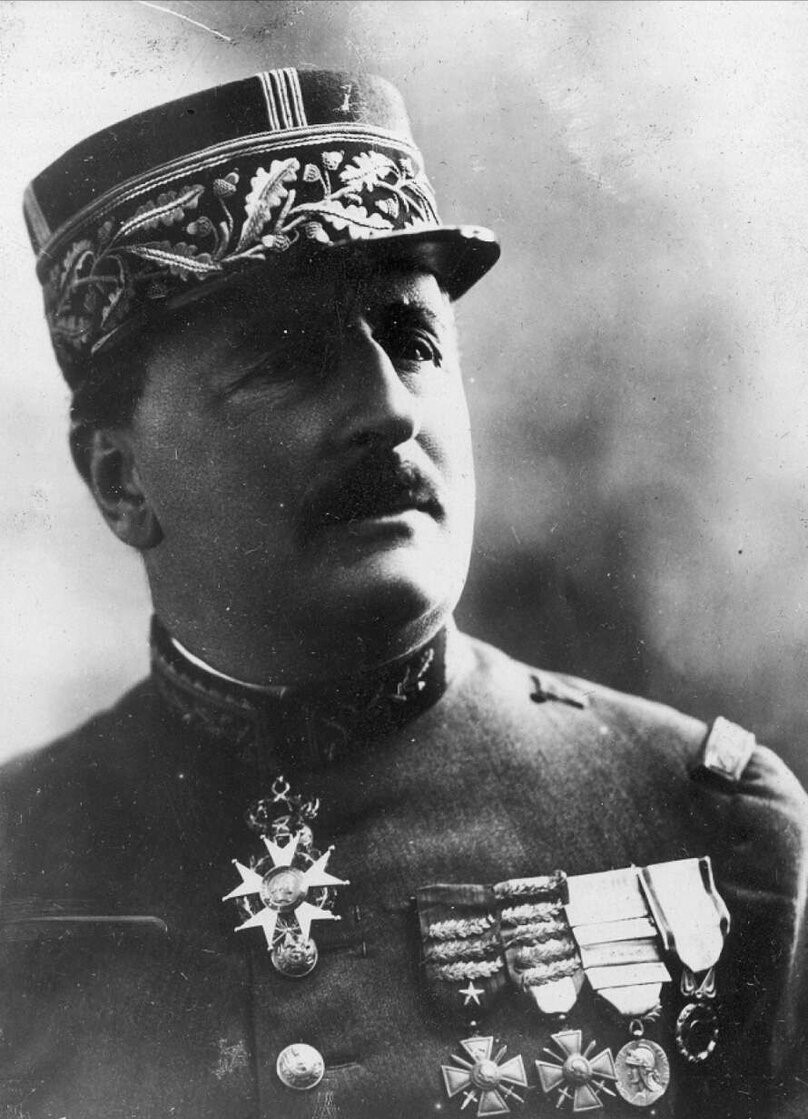
- Born: 14 December 1876; Paris
- Died: 20 August 1975 (aged 98)
- Military career
- Allegiance: France
- Branch: French Army
- Rank: Lieutenant-General
- Commands: Commandant of Meknes; Officer commanding, 1st Senegalese Colonial Division; Commander in Chief, French West Africa; Officer commanding, Colonial Forces in France; Officer commanding, Colonial Corps; Officer commanding, French Second Army
- Conflicts: Zaian War, World War I, Allied intervention in the Russian Civil War, Battle of France

Lieutenant-General Henry Freydenberg (14 December 1876 – 20 August 1975) was a French army officer. He was born in Paris on 14 December 1876 of German descent family.

In 1919 he was chief of staff to general d'Anselme during the French occupation of Odessa.

As a colonel in 1921 he commanded a groupe mobile (a brigade-sized mixed-arms force) in an operation that ended the 7-year Zaian War. He remained involved in post-war operations in the El Ksiba in April 1922. From 1924 to 1929 he served as French Commandant of Meknes in Morocco, transferring in 1929 to command the 1st Senegalese Colonial Division in Senegal. From 1931 to 1933 he was Commander in Chief of French West Africa and spent a short period without a posting before becoming, in 1933, General Officer Commanding Colonial Forces in France. He retired in 1938 but was recalled upon the outbreak of the Second World War and became commander of the Colonial Corps.

On 5 June 1940, during the Battle of France, he took over command of the French Second Army from Charles Huntziger, who had transferred to command the Fourth Army Group and who signed the Armistice with Germany on 22 June. He subsequently retired from the army for the second, and last, time.
