= Cilicia Peace Treaty =

1921 treaty ending the Franco-Turkish War

The Cilicia Peace Treaty (March 9, 1921) was signed in London between France and the Turkish National Movement based in Angora to end the fighting in the Franco-Turkish War.

The signatories were French foreign minister Aristide Briand and Turkish foreign minister Bekir Sami Bey. However, the treaty did not achieve the intended goals. It was subsequently replaced with the Treaty of Ankara.
