= Noël Garnier-Duplessix =

French army officer

- Garnier-Duplessix during the First World War as shown on his carte de visite
- Born: 25 December 1860; Rennes, France
- Died: 2 March 1928 (aged 67); Nice, France
- Military career
- Allegiance: France
- Branch: French Army
- Rank: General of Division
- Commands: 2nd Infantry Division; 37th Infantry Division; 9th Army Corps
- Conflicts: First World War; Zaian War; Franco-Turkish War
- Awards: Legion of Honor, GO 1920

General Noël Marie Amédée Garnier-Duplessix or Duplessis (25 December 1860 – 2 March 1928) was a French army officer. Whilst still a colonel he commanded the 2nd Infantry Division in the Allied victory at the First Battle of the Marne before seeing service in the Zaian War in the French protectorate of Morocco. Garnier-Duplessix returned to France in October 1916 and received command of the 37th Infantry Division for the 15 December offensive of the Battle of Verdun and the Nivelle Offensive of April 1917. He received command of the 9th Army Corps in June 1918 and led that unit to victory in the August Battle of Amiens and the autumn Meuse-Argonne Offensive. After the war he was posted to Cilicia in the Franco-Turkish War of 1918–21 where he argued against early withdrawal of troops following the March 1921 Cilicia Peace Treaty.

== Early life ==
Garnier-Duplessix was born on 25 December 1860 at Rennes in Brittany. His parents were Louis Marie Francois and Marguerite Blanche Lucie Boissonnet Garnier-Duplessix. He joined the French Army as a volunteer (initially for a 5-year period only) on 25 October 1880 at Rennes and entered the Ecole Spéciale Militaire de Saint-Cyr on 29 October. Garnier-Duplessix was steadily promoted through the cadet ranks, becoming a first class cadet on 13 April 1881, a corporal on 24 August, Quartermaster-Sergeant on 3 November and Sergeant-Major on 7 December. Upon passing out from the Ecole he joined the 19th Battalion of Light Infantry as a sub-lieutenant on 18 October 1882. He was promoted to lieutenant and transferred to the 47th Battalion on 31 May 1886. Garnier-Duplessix then joined the 7th Infantry Regiment on 23 February 1891.

Garnier-Duplessix was promoted to captain on 9 April 1892 and transferred to the 154th Infantry Regiment. He joined the 2nd Regiment of Algerian Tirailleurs on 11 November 1892 before becoming a staff officer for the military commander of Gabès, Tunisia on 27 November 1894. Garnier-Duplessix was appointed a chevalier of the Legion of Honour on 10 July 1899. He transferred to the staff of the 30th Infantry Division on 7 November 1899 and to the Algerian Division on 23 April 1900. Garnier-Duplessix was promoted to chef de bataillon on 2 April 1902 and transferred to the 19th Infantry Regiment. He joined the 1st Regiment of Algerian Tirailleurs on 6 May 1903. Garnier-Duplessix was appointed an officer of the Tunisian Order of Glory on 1 May 1902.

Garnier-Duplessix became a staff officer with the Constantine military division in Algeria on 25 January 1905. He was commended by Minister of War Eugène Étienne on 20 June 1906 for writing a study on the practicalities of commanding Algerian Tirrailleurs in the Sahara and held the Colonial Medal with clasp for the Sahara. Garnier-Duplessix married Augustine Ernestine Ledran on 27 February 1907 and they resided in Constantine. He became chief-of staff of the Constantine Division on 24 December 1907. Garnier-Duplessix was promoted to lieutenant-colonel on 25 March 1909 and to colonel of the 5th Indigenous Tirailleurs Regiment on 27 March 1913. He transferred to the staff of General Hubert Lyautey on 23 September 1913 to take command of units in Eastern Morocco. He later became commander of the Tadla-Zaian region of Morocco, centred on the post at Kasbah Tadla. On 27 July 1914 he was mentioned in dispatches for his command of a column during the capture of the town of Khénifra on 12 June.

== First World War ==
Garnier-Duplessix took over command of the 2nd Infantry Division from General Deligny on 8 September 1914. This was whilst the division was engaged in the important First Battle of the Marne that thwarted the German Schlieffen Plan objective of quickly capturing Paris. Garnier-Duplessix was subsequently posted to the French protectorate of Morocco where he came under the command of General Hubert Lyautey. In Morocco he was placed in command of a groupe mobile, a mobile combined arms force, based at Sidi Lamine and participated in the Zaian War against the Berbers of the Middle Atlas. After the French defeat at the Battle of El Herri left Khénifra threatened with capture, Garnier-Duplessix led his groupe mobile 30 miles (48 km) through continuous Berber ambushes to relieve the strategically important town within three days. He was appointed an officer of the Legion of Honour on 3 December 1914.

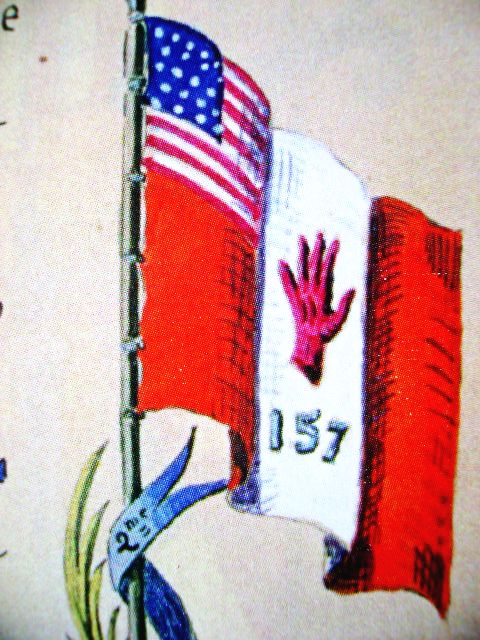
Flag of the 157th Division

Garnier-Duplessix returned to the Western Front in October 1916, to command the 37th Infantry Division in the Battle of Verdun. The division participated in the assault of 15 December 1916 when the Germans were pushed back 3 miles (4.8 km) and the French captured 11,000 prisoners (including 300 officers), 115 artillery pieces, hundreds of machine guns and many supply depots. Garnier-Duplessix later led the 37th Division in the Nivelle Offensive of April 1917 where his troops included the 5th Regiment of the Russian Expeditionary Force in France. On 6 October 1917 he was appointed a commander of the Legion of Honour.

Garnier-Duplessix became commander of the 9th Army Corps in June 1918 and led the Corps in the decisive victory at the Battle of Amiens in August. IX corps included the famous 157th Infantry Division, known as the "Red Hand Division". This participated in the Meuse-Argonne Offensive of September/October and though it was a unit of the French Army, contained some American units as reinforcements. One such unit was the 372nd Infantry Regiment, a segregated African American regiment, which distinguished itself in the battle. The 372nd advanced 8 kilometres (5.0 mi) through German lines, taking 600 prisoners, 15 heavy guns, 20 trench mortars and 150 machine guns. They also captured important supplies of artillery ammunition and engineering material and downed three enemy aircraft. Garnier-Duplessix wrote them a message of commendation to which the divisional commander, General Mariano Goybet, added: "the Red Hand sign of the division, has, thanks to you, become a bloody hand which took the Boche by the throat and made him cry for mercy. You have well avenged our glorious dead."

== Post-war ==
Garnier-Duplessix became a grand officer of the Legion of Honour on 22 July 1920. Garnier-Duplessix was posted to Alexandretta in Turkey during the Franco-Turkish War of 1918–21. He was appointed adjutant general and was responsible for co-ordinating three divisions of infantry, seven batteries of artillery, a cavalry regiment and two squadrons of aircraft. This force swept from east to west across Turkish Cilicia in October 1920, meeting serious resistance at Tarsus, where it destroyed Turkish fortifications to the north of the city. After the signing of the Cilicia Peace Treaty on 9 March 1921 the French Minister of War Louis Barthou wrote to Garnier-Duplessix asking him to make arrangements for the evacuation of Cilicia. Garnier-Duplessix replied with a note stating that it was impossible to evacuate the province within the requested timespan of one month due to the difficulty in establishing a sufficient police force in that period to maintain order and prevent reprisals, particularly against Christians.

He died on 2 March 1928 at Nice.
