= Battle of El Herri =

1914 battle of the Zaian War

Coordinates: 32°51′27″N 05°37′21″W

- Part of the Zaian War
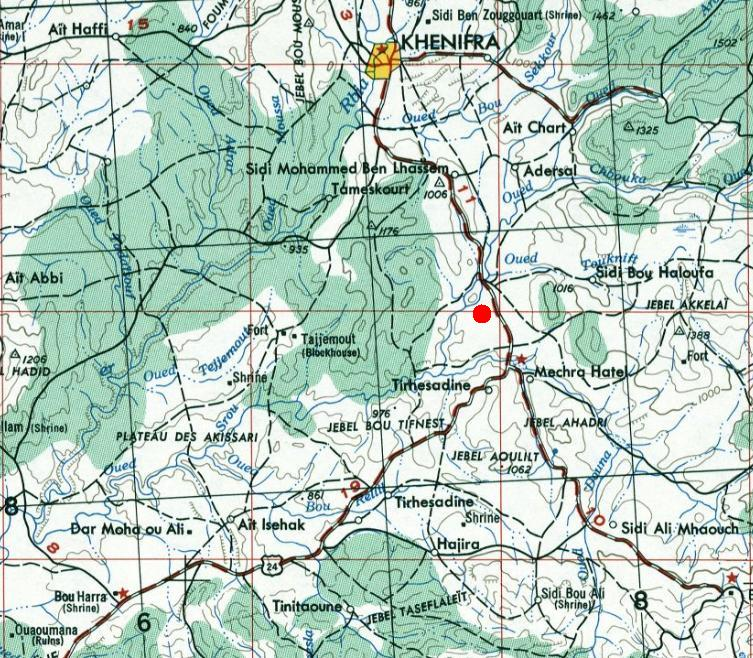
- Location of the battle shown on a 1953 map.
Date	13 November 1914
Location	El Herri, near Khénifra, Morocco
Result	Zaian victory

Belligerents
France	Zaian Confederation

Commanders and leaders
René Laverdure †	Mouha ou Hammou Zayani

Strength
43 officers and 1,187 men	Estimated by the French at 5,000 tribesmen

Casualties and losses
590 men and 33 officers killed 5 officers and 171 men wounded	At least 182 killed

The Battle of El Herri (also known as Elhri) was fought between France and the Berber Zaian Confederation on 13 November 1914. It took place at the small settlement of El Herri, near Khénifra in the French protectorate in Morocco. The battle was part of the Zaian War, in which the confederation of tribes sought to oppose continued French expansion into the interior of Morocco. Having captured the strategic town of Khénifra earlier in the year, the French, under General Hubert Lyautey, entered negotiations with Mouha ou Hammou Zayani, who led the Zaian. Lyautey thought that peace could be achieved and ordered Lieutenant-Colonel René Laverdure, who commanded the garrison in Khénifra, not to launch any offensives.

Laverdure became frustrated with the lack of action and, on 13 November, led almost his entire garrison in an attack on the Zaian encampment at El Herri. The attack initially went well, with his artillery and cavalry clearing the tribesmen from the camp, looting the Zaian tents and capturing two of Hammou's wives. However, the French encountered a significant Zaian force during its withdrawal to Khénifra. This force engaged the French with harassing fire, forcing them to move only under the cover of their artillery. Laverdure then ordered his wounded back to Khénifra with a guard of a company of infantry, which were joined by large numbers of other troops who broke ranks to join the column. Whilst making a river crossing, Laverdure's rear guard and artillery were overrun and annihilated. Laverdure's remaining troops then formed a square and fought a desperate last stand against several thousand tribesmen before they were also overrun and killed.

The French losses were significant: some 623 North African, Senegalese and French soldiers (including Laverdure) were killed and 176 wounded. The Zaian lost at least 182 men killed. The column of wounded reached Khénifra just ahead of pursuing Zaian forces and the town came under siege. Lyautey was dismayed at Laverdure's actions and was briefly of the opinion that he had cost him the war. However, a relief force reached Khénifra within a few days and the situation stabilised. The Zaian War lasted until 1921 when negotiations secured the submission of much of the confederation to French rule and a military offensive pushed the remainder into the High Atlas mountains.

== Background ==
France's protectorate of Morocco was established after French intervention in the Agadir Crisis of 1911. Resident General Louis-Hubert Lyautey served as the head of government and one of his main aims was to secure the "Taza corridor" in the Middle Atlas mountains linking Tunis to the Moroccan Atlantic coast. He was opposed by the Berber tribes in the area, amongst them the Zaian confederation led by Mouha ou Hammou Zayani. Hammou had opposed the French intervention since 1877 and led between 4,000 and 4,200 tents (the tribal unit of measurement) of people.

French attempts to persuade Hammou to submit had failed and in May 1914 Lyautey authorised General Paul Prosper Henrys to take command of all French troops in the area and launch an attack on Taza and Khénifra, vital parts of the corridor. Despite some fierce engagements with the Zaian in the Khénifra area, Henrys secured the two towns by the middle of June and inflicted substantial losses on the tribes. As part of the defence of the area, Henrys established three Groupes Mobile, mobile columns of troops who could react quickly to threats. A Groupe Mobile was established at Khénifra under Lieutenant-Colonel René Laverdure, another to the west under Lieutenant-Colonel Henri Claudel and a third to the east under Colonel Noël Garnier-Duplessix. July saw increasing attacks on Laverdure's command and the outbreak of the First World War which significantly reduced the number of French forces based in Morocco. Lyautey was determined to hold Khénifra to use as a bridgehead for further expansion of French territory and referred to it as a bastion against the "hostile Berber masses" upon which the "maintenance of [his] occupation" depended.

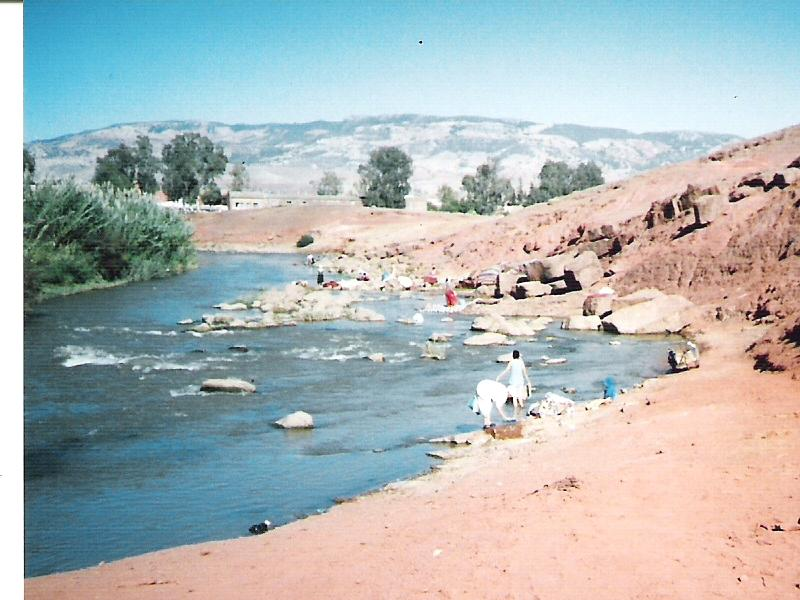
The Oum er Rbia at Khénifra

Successfully repulsing additional attacks on Khénifra, Henrys thought he had the upper hand, having proven that the reduced French forces could resist the tribesmen. The Zaian were now contained within a triangle formed by the Oum er Rbia, the Serrou river and the Atlas mountains and were already in dispute with neighbouring tribes over the best wintering land.

== Battle ==
=== Laverdure's attack ===
Laverdure had been in Khénifra for five months when Hammou set up camp at El Herri, a small village 15 km (9.3 mi) away, for the winter. Hammou had been promised peace talks and had just lost control over five tribes who began negotiations for submission to French rule. Henrys believed that Zaian resistance was near its end and that the war would soon be over. Lyautey wished to keep the situation calm and twice refused Laverdure permission to attack the camp at El Herri, for fear that it would affect the peace talks and that Laverdure had insufficient forces available for the assault. He was instead ordered to keep to the French bank of the Oum er Rbia and had permission only to send troops out for convoy protection, wood gathering and road building.

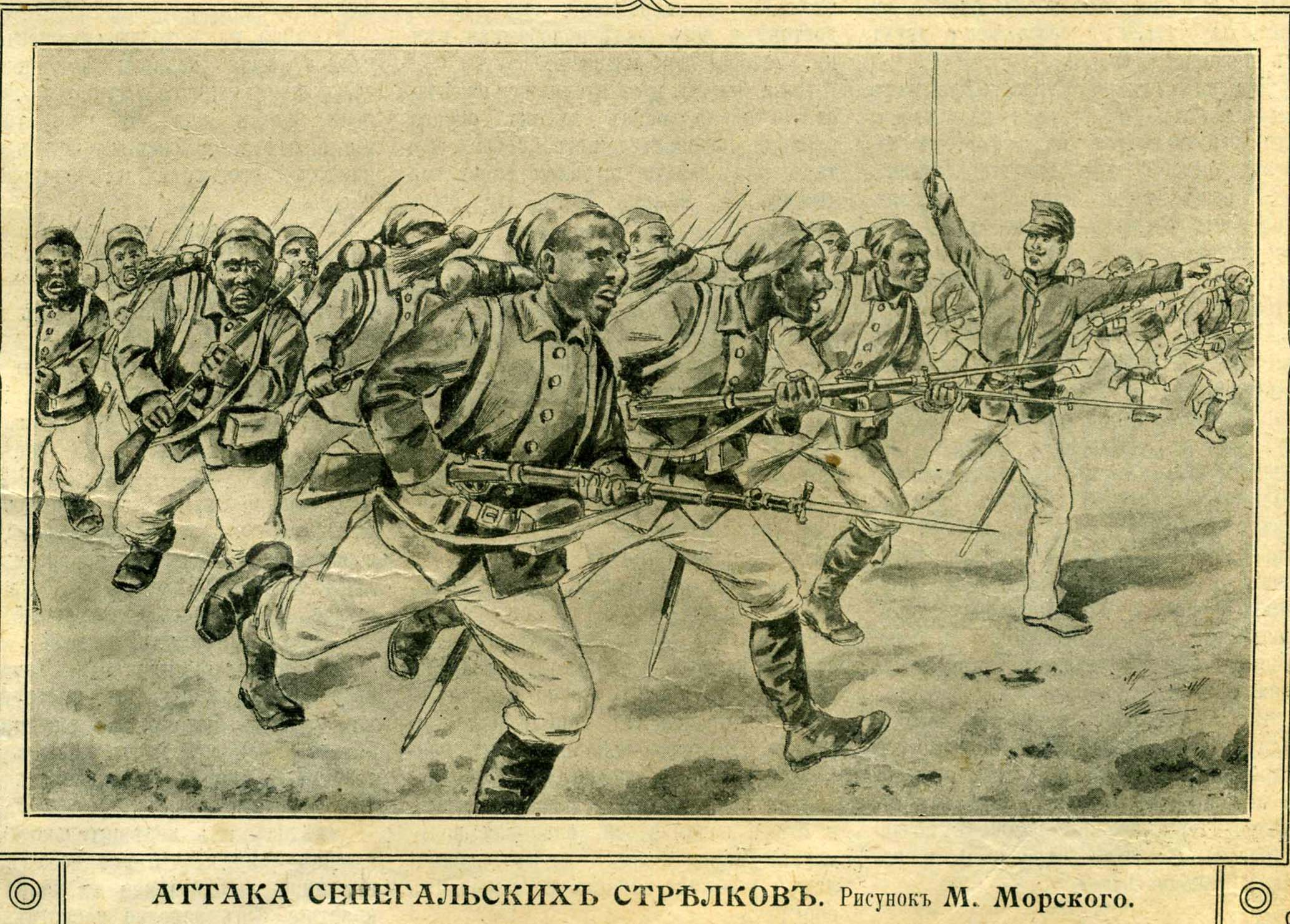
Senegalese Tirailleurs taking part in a bayonet charge in a drawing taken from a contemporary Russian magazine

However Laverdure decided to disobey his orders to remain in Khénifra and marched on El Herri with almost the entire garrison. He was said to be frustrated with the lack of action on the front and may have been persuaded by a Makhzen soldier eager to avenge a personal affront he had received from Hammou. Laverdure's column consisted of six infantry companies of Algerian and Senegalese Tirailleurs, a French detachment of colonial infantry, a party of irregular Goumiers, two batteries of 65mm and 75mm (the famous Soixante-Quinze) cannon and a squadron of Tunisian Spahi cavalry: numbering 43 officers and 1,187 men in total. This amounted to less than half the troops he had had in September when he was first denied permission to launch an attack. Laverdure marched at 2.30 am on the morning of 13 November 1914 without informing his superiors, only leaving behind a note saying he was going to "annihilate" Hammou's camp.

Laverdure's column reached El Herri at dawn and found the encampment of 100 tents. Most of the Zaian men were out of camp at the time, leaving behind the non-combatants, and Laverdure achieved complete surprise. The first that many of the Zaian knew of the attack was when his artillery shells began exploding amongst the tents. This was followed up by a cavalry charge which cleared the camp but was halted by a group of tribesmen who had rallied on a hilltop to the south and inflicted "numerous losses" on the horsemen. Laverdure had to send in his infantry to remove these Zaians, before looting the encampment. Hammou escaped in time but two of his wives were captured before the French headed back to Khénifra at around 8.30 am, leaving the looting to tribesmen of the Aït Ichkern, formerly Hammou's allies, who assumed he was now beaten.

=== Zaian counterattack ===
Urged on by the shrieking of their womenfolk, all of them, even any who before may have been somewhat hesitant, appear all round the horizon; onward, through the rain of machine-gun fire and shells they rush, wedging in and out through the underbrush and rocks until they are right up onto the French units already hampered by having to carry their dead, whom they must preserve from mutilation, and their wounded whom they must save. In 1914, at El Herri, an entire French column was thus almost totally annihilated.

— A French staff officer describing the loss of the column at El Herri.

The return to Khénifra was initially hampered by attacks by small groups of tribesmen who were beaten off, but discovered the relatively small number of troops in the French column. Word was passed to others and soon a force, estimated at 5,000 by the French, was assembled. These men consisted of almost the entire Zaian tribe and elements of the Mrabtin, Aït Harkat, Aït Ischak and Aït Ichkern (the latter, seeing the French falling back, had changed allegiance once more). Zaian tactics were to harass the flanks and rear of the column and to occupy any convenient high ground for sniping attacks. The French found they could not move in safety without heavy covering fire from the artillery, which was reduced in effectiveness by the dispersed positions of the Zaian tribesmen and their use of cover. Hammou's nephew, Moha ou Akka, led a force of several thousand tribesmen around the French to cut off their route back to Khénifra.

At this point Laverdure ordered one company of his Senegalese infantry to leave the column to accompany a convoy of wounded soldiers to Khénifra. Many of his other troops, seeing the Senegalese leaving, broke ranks and followed in panic. Laverdure attempted to continue his withdrawal but, just having crossed the Chbouka river, his rearguard was surrounded and attacked repeatedly from all sides, being quickly overrun. The gun batteries soon suffered the same fate, their crews also being killed. The Zaian assembled on the ridges surrounding the remaining French troops, who had formed a defensive square, before launching a final attack with "several thousand" men. This attack lasted just a few minutes and, after a desperate struggle, the square was broken and the remainder of the column was wiped out. The Zaian chased down and killed any of the survivors who attempted to hide in the scrub.

The wounded and their escort struggled into Khénifra at about noon, narrowly outpacing the Zaian who had stopped to loot the bodies of the French dead. These men, numbering 171 men and five officers wounded and 426 men and five officers able bodied, were the only French survivors of the battle. A total of 623 French troops had died, along with at least 182 of the Zaian. French losses amounted to 218 Algerian or Tunisian Tirailleurs, 210 French soldiers and 33 French officers, 125 Senegalese Tirailleurs and 37 Moroccan Goums killed. The French officers suffered the highest casualty rate of any group with 90% of them being killed or wounded (including Laverdure who died in the final attack); four of the five unwounded officers belonged to the cavalry. Around 65% of the entire force had been killed or wounded and the French were forced to abandon 4 machine guns, 630 small arms, 62 horses, 56 mules, and all of their artillery; plus camping equipment and personal belongings. Hammou took much of this with him when he escaped to the mountains of the Middle Atlas.

== Aftermath ==
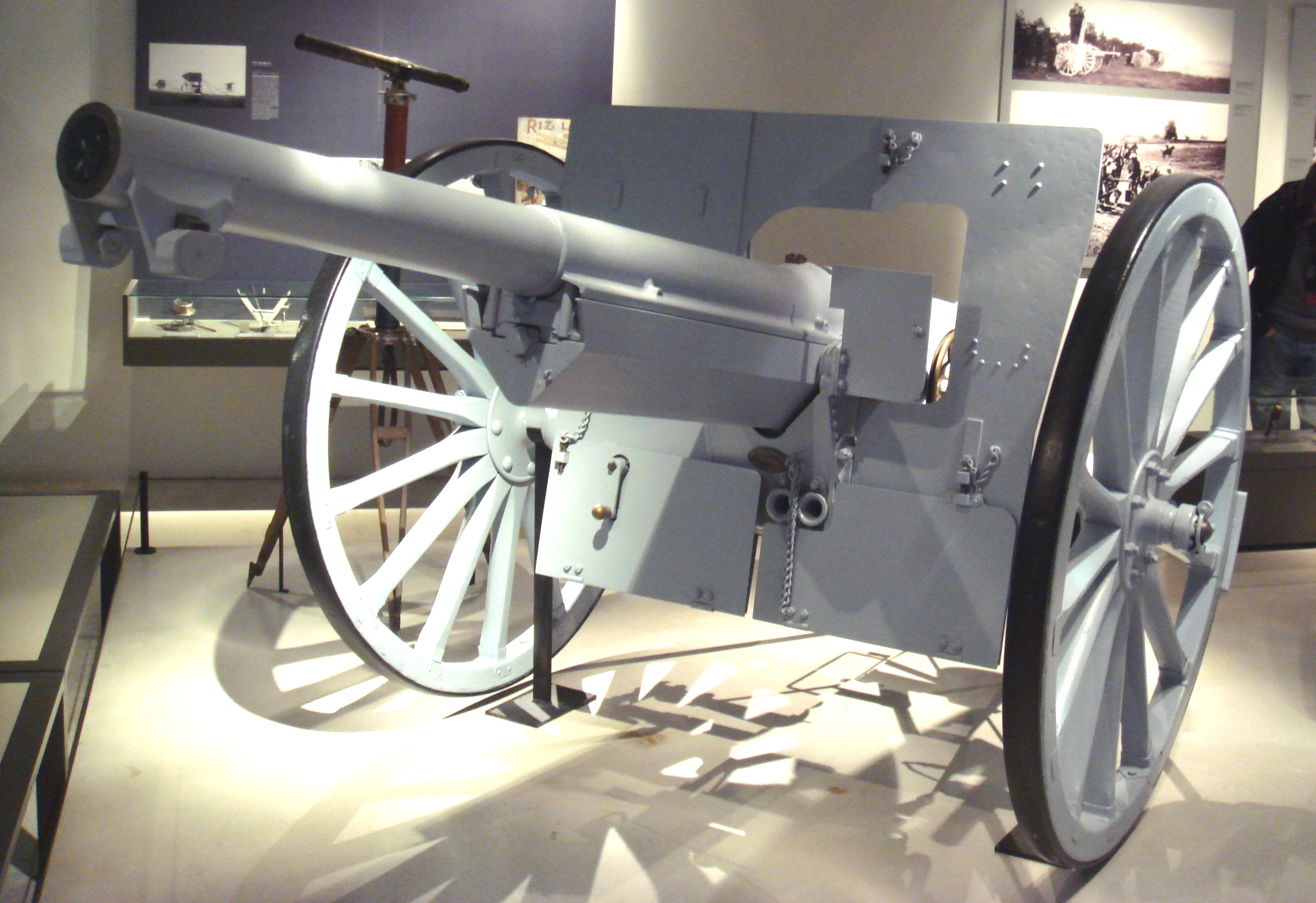
A Soixante-Quinze similar to the four lost by the French at El Herri

The disaster left Captain Pierre Kroll as the senior officer of the remnants of the Khénifra garrison, some three companies of tirailleurs (one of which was an ad hoc unit made up from the partially equipped and badly shaken survivors of the battle). Having secured the defences he immediately telegraphed Lyautey and Henrys to inform them of events, the first they had heard of Laverdure's foray. Lyautey was briefly of the opinion that the event would cause the loss of the whole of Morocco. The next morning Zaian horsemen appeared on the hilltops to the south and east of the city. Khénifra soon came under constant siege from the tribes.

Henrys left Fez for Meknes from which he telegraphed Lyautey promising to "strike hard and fast" so that the "Laverdure disaster" did not threaten the French position in Morocco. He said that "everyone, everywhere must be aware of the fact that our forces are numerous, that strong columns are already on their way to Khenifra, and that the repression will be swift". Henrys dispatched Garnier-Duplessix's Groupe Mobile to Khénifra from El Graar and ordered Lieutenant-Colonel Joseph Dérigoin to form another Groupe at Ito for mobile support. Garnier-Duplessix was forced to fight his way through groups of Zaian tribesmen and did not reach the town until 16 November. Henrys joined Dérigoin and entered the town himself two days later, encountering no resistance on the way. Another part of the Khénifra relief force was the 6th battalion of the 2nd French Foreign Legion who marched from Mrirt and saw action at El Hammam and along the Oum er Rbia. By the end of the month, the French garrison had swelled to 7,000 troops, an all-time high. Henrys, Garnier-Duplessix and Kroll were all promoted shortly after the battle in recognition of their actions to prevent the loss of Khénifra.

As a show of force, Henrys led excursions from Khénifra to El Herri on 19 and 20 November. He observed many campfires and some groups of tribesmen but on the whole the Zaian, who had moved their main camps away from the area, kept their distance. Henrys observed the field of battle and ordered the burial of the French dead, finding many stripped of their clothing and some mutilated or decapitated by post-mortem dagger wounds. Laverdure's body and those of six of his officers were missing, having been removed by Hammou for use as trophies but were later exchanged for Hammou's captured wives. The Zaian leader displayed these trophies and captured weapons to nearby tribes to encourage them to support him, a tactic that proved particularly successful with the tribes to the north. Although French forces subsequently fought several successful actions against the Zaian and recovered the captured weapons, El Herri showed that they could be beaten. The battle, along with the siding of the Ottoman Empire with the Central Powers in the First World War and slow French progress on the Western Front, led to increasing numbers of recruits for Hammou.

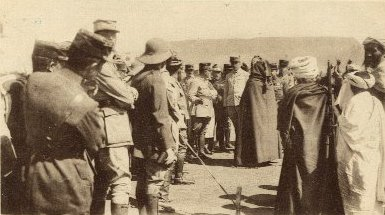
Hammou's son, Hassan, surrendering to General Poeymireau

The Zaian war continued for many years after El Herri with Henrys changing tactics from negotiation and bribery to "submit or starve". Subsequent victories in the Middle Atlas restored the French image of superiority in force and led to increasing submissions and the withdrawal of the Zaian deeper into the mountains. By 1917, the French had managed to establish a military road straight through the Middle Atlas, limiting the free movement of the Zaian. The end of the war came through political rather than military means with Hammou's sons submitting, on his advice, to the French in June 1920. Their submission persuaded 3,000 tents of Zaian to follow and within six weeks just 2,500 tents remained opposed to French rule. Hammou was killed in Spring 1921 by a Berber war party led by Hassan and soon after a combined French and Berber attack on Bekrit defeated the last remaining Zaian force, ending the seven-year-long war. After the war, French expansion in the area continued and they brought almost the entire Middle Atlas under their control by June 1922.

== Reasons for French defeat ==
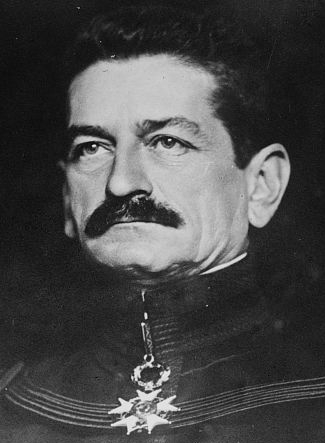
General Mangin whose opinions on the war Lyautey blamed for Laverdure's actions

Though they had previously held him in high regard, Lyautey and Henrys blamed Laverdure for this major defeat, with the latter describing the Lieutenant-Colonel's march from Khénifra as a "poorly prepared and poorly executed" "act of indiscipline". Laverdure, whose previous service had been mainly in Indochina (see above), was thought to have underestimated the ability of the Berbers to operate offensively in mountainous terrain against his column. His motive for the "inexcusable imprudence" of disobeying orders is thought to have been for personal glory and to bring the war to an early conclusion. One of the survivors of the battle, Jean Pichon, said that Laverdure was "haunted by the obsessive temptation" of defeating Hammou. Lyautey stated, in a letter to Minister of War Alexandre Millerand, that Laverdure, had he not died on the field, would have deserved "the most severe punishment" at the hands of a military tribunal.

It is thought that Laverdure's actions may have been influenced by a school of thought advocated by General Charles Mangin; that bold movements would intimidate the North African tribes into submission. This school of thought was critical of Lyautey's campaign of negotiation backed up by the threat of military power, arguing that it cost too many casualties and that a bolder commander should be appointed instead. Mangin's opinions had many advocates among the French officers of the colonial forces in Morocco, keen to end the war quickly and transfer to the Western Front. His views were praised by newspapers, books and journal articles in France, and had the support of part of the Chamber of Deputies. Lyautey believed that he had to constantly oppose this mindset, concluding that officers advocating it were "self-satisfied with its infallibility and convinced of the pitiful inferiority of those who do not submit to it blindly".

== Legacy ==
The battle was a shock to the French who had not expected the tribes to get the better of a well-armed column. Lyautey himself said that "in our entire colonial history there has never been a case of the destruction of such an important force, of the loss of [almost] all its officers ..., of the disappearance of so much materiel and booty of war". The battle has been described variously as the worst ever defeat of French forces in Morocco, the worst in North Africa and one of the worst in the French colonies. The heavy losses suffered at El Herri overshadowed the planning of French military policy for Morocco during the First World War.

Today the battle is celebrated by the Moroccan press as a major event in Moroccan history, alongside other instances of resistance against French and Spanish occupation. An obelisk was erected near to the battlefield in 1991 and was unveiled by two Moroccan ministers, Moulay Ahmed Alaoui and Muhammad El-Ansar, listing the names of the 182 Moroccan dead. Hammou is recorded on the obelisk as being a "proud champion" of "national resistance". The monument's Arabic text contains some mistakes, recording the French dead at 700 in number (Henrys recorded 623) and giving the year of the battle as 1912.

== See also ==
- The Battle of Annual, a similar battle but on a much larger scale during the Rif War in which a Spanish colonial force was defeated by Moroccan irregulars.
