= Paul Prosper Henrys =

French general (1862-1943)

General Henrys

Paul Prosper Henrys (French: [pɔl pʁɔspɛʁ ɑ̃ʁi]; 13 March 1862 – 6 November 1943) was a French general.

In his early career, Henrys was stationed in French Algeria. In 1912, he participated in the French conquest of Morocco under general Hubert Lyautey. In May 1914, he received command over all French troops fighting in the Zaian War. Henrys was replaced by Colonel Joseph-François Poeymirau in July 1916 and was sent to fight the Germans on the Western Front.

Henrys commanded the French army on the Salonika front (L'Armée d'Orient) in the final year of the First World War. Subsequently, he was the chief of the French Military Mission to Poland during the Polish-Soviet War.

Grades:

- 04/07/13 général de brigade
- 24/11/14 général de division

Service history:

- 28/09/12-27/07/16 - cavalry commander of units in Morocco
- 27/07/16-20/05/17 - commander of 59th infantry division (reserve)
- 20/05/17-12/12/17 - commander of 17th army corps
- 31/12/17-01/04/19 - commander of the French army in the East (on the Balkan front)
- 01/04/19-30/09/20 - chief of the French Military Mission to Poland
- 28/06/22-13/03/24 - commander of 33rd army corps in the Rhineland.
- 13/03/24- placed in reserve
