= Mouha ou Hammou Zayani =

Moroccan Berber leader (c. 1863–1921)

- Muḥa u Ḥemmu Aẓayyi
- Born: 1857 or 1863; Middle Atlas, Morocco
- Died: March 27, 1921 (aged 63–64) or (57–58)
- Resting place: Ben Cherro near Tamalakt
- Other names: Amhazoun
- Office: Qaid of the Zayanes
- Predecessor: Moha Ou Aqqa
- Children: Rabha el Zayania; Hassan ould Mouha Ou Hammou Zayani; Ytto el Zayania; Amahrok ould Mouha Ou Hammou Zayani
- Military career
- Conflicts: Zaian War; Battle of El Herri

Mouha Ou Hammou Zayani (Central Atlas Tamazight: Muḥa u Ḥemmu Aẓayyi; (Note: His full name was Muhammad Ou Hammou ben Aqqa ben Ahmad. He was also known as Moha Ou Hamou al-Harkati Zayani and Amhazoun.) c. 1863 – 27 March 1921) was a Moroccan Berber military figure and tribal leader who was the qaid of the Zayanes in the Khénifra region and who led resistance against French colonialism in the Zaian War.

== Early life and becoming qaid ==
Muhammad Ou Hammou ben Aqqa ben Ahmad was born in 1857 or 1863 in the Middle Atlas. He belonged to the Imazhan clan which is part of the Ayt Harkat section of the Zayane. His father was Moha Ou Aqqa who was the tribal leader of Ayt Harkat. He died when Mouha Ou Hammou was around 20 years old and after his death, his oldest son, Said, succeeded him extending his dominance over his tribe and the Zayane confederation. After Said's death in battle in 1877, Mouha succeeded him becoming the amghar of the Imhazan.

In order to unite the disunited Zayane and avoid being attacked by the sultan Hassan I, he sought submitting to Hassan with hopes of being appointed qaid. Because of the advice of an influential local marabout and friend, Sidi Ben Dawd Sherqawi, and while Hassan was in Tadla forcing the tribes of the region to submit and pay tribute, Mouha travelled to Tadla with his cousin Bouhassous to find the Sultan's camp. He was introduced to Hassan through Sherqawi and he knelt at the monarch's feet. Hassan was impressed by this show of submission and made him qaid of the Ayt Ya’qoub half of the Zayane confirmed through a regal document. He also gifted Mouha a fine black cloak, a detachment of 300 Sharifian infantry under the qaid Zouggati and three cannons. Hassan I gave Mouha the title of Qaid in 1886 or 1880.

== Zaian War ==
After the Treaty of Fes (1912), which put Morocco under the French Protectorate, Mouha, at the head of the Zayanes tribe, started a guerrilla war, known as the Zaian War. He managed to unite several Berber tribes of the Middle Atlas and fought smaller battles. The town of Khénifra was lost to the advancing French forces in June 1914, but in November of the same year, the Battle of El Herri took place and Mouha inflicted heavy losses (around 600 casualties) upon the French military. The battle was later dubbed the 'Moroccan Dien Bien Phu' in reference to the decisive battle in the French Indochina War. Despite the victory, Mouha could not secure Khénifra and retired to the region of Taoujgalt, where he recruited more men and prepared for further attacks against the French army. In May 1920, his sons Hassan and Amharoq who then led the Zayan tribe, surrendered to General Poeymirau.

== Death and legacy ==
On 27 March 1921, Mouha was killed in a battle at Azelag N'Tazemourte against his son Hassan, who led a Zayane detachment. He was buried at Ben Cherro near Tamalakt where a masouleum and a mosque was built around his tomb.

His daughter Rabha married Sultan Abd al-Hafid. He is the grandfather of Lalla Latifa and great grandfather of the current king of Morocco Mohammed VI of Morocco.

== See also ==
- Moha ou Said
- Assou Oubasslam
- Abd el-Krim
- Thami El Glaoui
