= Zayanes =

Berber people in central Morocco

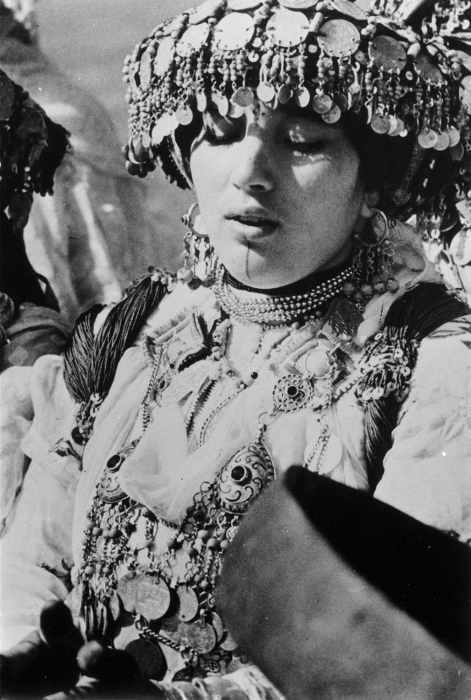
A Berber woman of the Zayane tribes, 1955

Zayanes (Central Atlas Tamazight: Aẓayyi (singular), Iẓayyan (plural); Arabic: زيان, romanized: Zayān) are a Berber population inhabiting the Khenifra region, located in the central Middle Atlas mountains of Morocco.

== History ==
Zayanes tribes are known for their attachment to ancestral land and for their tenacity as warriors, especially during the colonization, led by Mouha ou Hammou Zayani. Thus they have prevented many invaders from easily seizing Khénifra. Despite the French defeat in the Battle of El Herri, 13 November 1914, the colonizers were determined not to abandon the fight against the Zayanes, but concerned French troops in invading Morocco in coming face to face with the Zayanes.

Zayan Confederation
- 1877–1921
- Zayanes territories.
- Capital: Khenifra
- Religion: Islam
- History
  - Established: 1877
  - Disestablished: 1921
Succeeded by
French protectorate in Morocco
- Today part of: Morocco

== Geography ==
The tribes of Zayanes live in the Middle Atlas mountain range in the area of Khénifra. The Zayanes belong to a large tribe that twice a year wanders toward Azaghar, where the climate is milder in contrast to Adrar where the winter is very severe.

The Zayanes speak Central Atlas Tamazight (Tazayit), which is one of the Berber languages.

The Zayanes enjoy goat's and ewe's milk as well as Ahriche. The latter is a dish of tripe, usually consisting of ganglion, caul, lung or heart of an animal wound with intestines on a stick of oak and cooked on hot coals. Ait Harkat (Aït Lahcen Ousaïd)

== Socio-political organisation ==
The zayanes are divided into two major tribes:

- Aït Harakat
  - Aït Bouhou
  - Aït Moussa
  - Aït Khouya
  - Aït Bajji
  - Aït Alla
  - Aït Benichi
  - Aït Maï
  - Aït Chard
  - Aït Hadou ou hamou
  - Aït Bouhmad
  - Ihbarn
- Aït Oumalou
  - Aït Boumazoughe
  - Aït Ammou Aissa
  - Aït Boumzil
  - Aït Bouhadou
