= Treaty of Fes =

1912 treaty establishing French Morocco

Treaty of Fes معاهدة فاس Traité de Fès
Treaty Concluded Between France and Morocco on 30 March 1912, for the Organization of the French Protectorate in the Sharifian Empire Traité conclu entre la France et le Maroc le 30 mars 1912, pour l'organisation du protectorat français dans l'Empire chérifien
- The Treaty of Fes, with its French text here handwritten in cursive calligraphy, along with a certified Arabic translation written in a cursive mujawhar Maghrebi style.
- Type: Treaty of protection
- Signed: 30 March 1912; 114 years ago
- Location: Fes
- Signatories: Abd al-Hafid of Morocco; Eugène Regnault
- Parties: Sultanate of Morocco; French Republic

The Treaty of Fes (Arabic: معاهدة فاس, French: Traité de Fès), officially the Treaty Concluded Between France and Morocco on 30 March 1912, for the Organization of the French Protectorate in the Sharifian Empire (French: Traité conclu entre la France et le Maroc le 30 mars 1912, pour l'organisation du protectorat français dans l'Empire chérifien), was a treaty signed by Sultan Abd al-Hafid of Morocco under duress and French diplomat Eugène Regnault on 30 March 1912. It established the French protectorate in Morocco, and remained in effect until the Franco-Moroccan Joint Declaration of 2 March 1956.

The treaty gave France the right to occupy certain parts of the country with the pretext of protecting the Sultan from internal opposition, and to hold actual reins of power while preserving the mask of indirect rule consisted of the Sultan and the Sharifian government. Under the terms, the French Resident-General held absolute powers in external as well as internal affairs, and was the only one capable of representing Morocco in foreign countries. The Sultan however, retained the right to sign the decrees (dahirs), which were submitted by the Resident-Generals.

When news of the treaty finally leaked to the Moroccan populace, it was met with immediate and violent backlash in the Intifada of Fes.

== Background ==
=== Context ===
Weakened by defeat in the Franco-Moroccan War, Morocco signed the Anglo-Moroccan Treaty of 1856, which broke the Moroccan state's monopoly on customs revenue, a vital source of income for the Makhzen. The Treaty of Wad Ras following the Hispano-Moroccan War (1859–60) forced Morocco to take a massive British loan—larger than its national reserves—in order to pay off a massive war indemnity to Spain, putting the Makhzen further in debt.

European presence in Morocco—in the form of advisors, doctors, businessmen, adventurers, and even missionaries—dramatically increased after the Madrid Conference of 1880, which was held at the behest of Sultan Hassan I in response to France and Spain's abuse of the protégé system. More than half of the Makhzen's expenditures went abroad to pay war indemnities and buy weapons, military equipment, and manufactured goods.

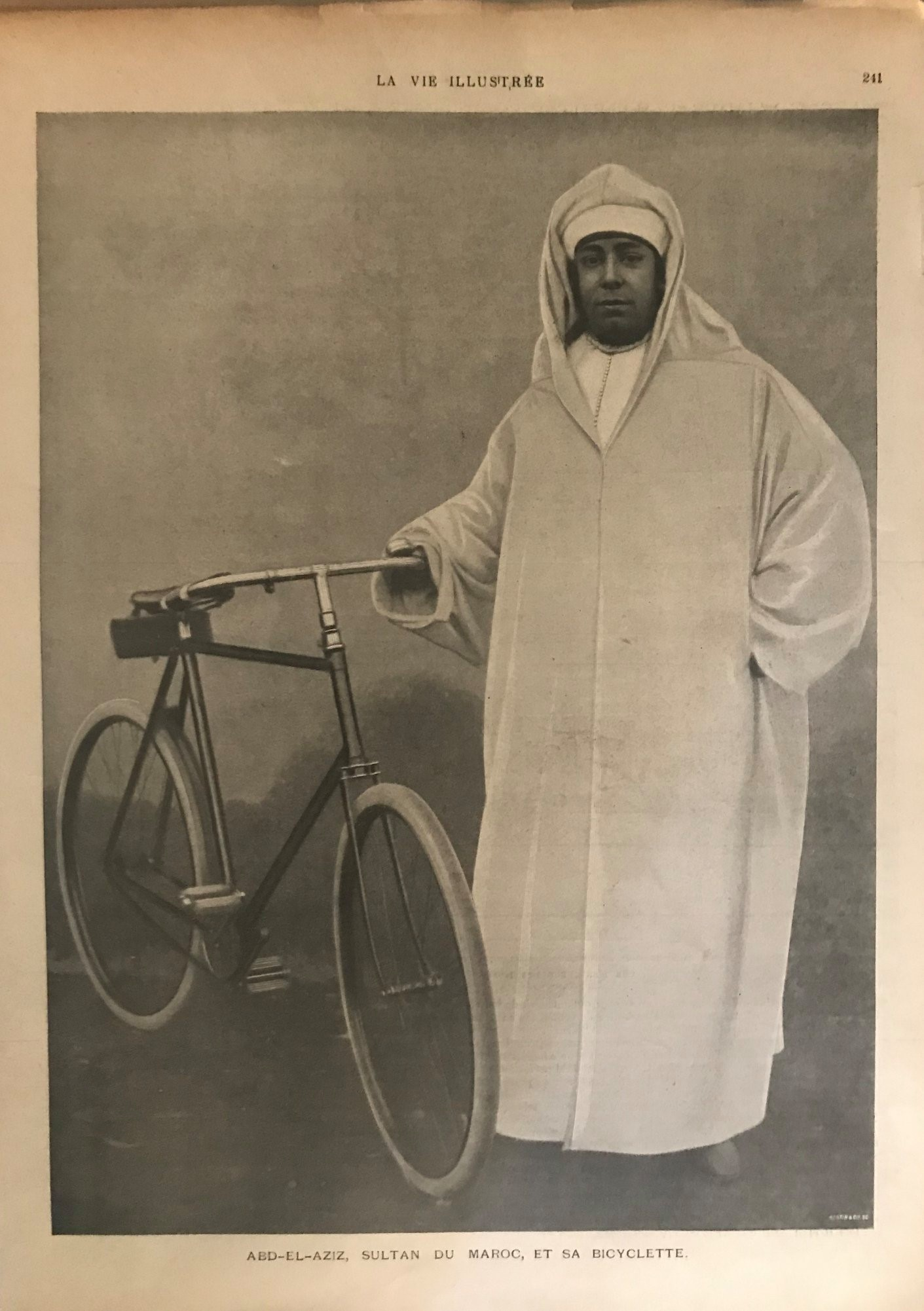
Sultan Abd-el-Aziz with his bicycle in 1901. The young sultan was noted for his impulsive spending habits, which exacerbated a major trade deficit.

From 1902 to 1909, Morocco's trade deficit increased 14 million francs annually, and the Moroccan rial depreciated 25% from 1896 to 1906. Morocco became bridled under loans and debts to balance its budget. The first of these came in December 1901–7.5 million francs borrowed from French banks 6% interest. This was followed by British and Belgian loans. Abdelaziz tried to impose a tartib (ترتيب)—a flat tax universally hated that failed by 1903. In June 1904, France bailed out the Makhzen with 62.5 million franks, guaranteed by a portion of customs revenue.

Moroccan historian Abdallah Laroui noted "The more those at the top borrowed, the more those at the bottom were impoverished." Morocco experienced a famine from 1903 to 1907, as well as insurrections led by El-Rogui (Bou Hmara) and Mulai Ahmed er Raisuni. Abd al-Hafid wrested the throne from his brother Abd al-Aziz in the Hafidiya (1907–1908) coup d'état.

=== French concessions to competing powers ===
Private agreements among the United Kingdom and France in 1904, collectively known as the Entente Cordiale, made without consulting the sultan, had divided the Maghreb into spheres of influence, with France given Morocco. The 1906 Treaty of Algeciras formalized the French pre-eminence over other European great powers in Morocco, and affirmed its right to collect customs revenue from Moroccan ports.

In the aftermath of the Agadir Crisis of 1911, Germany recognised the French position in Morocco and received in return territories in the French Equatorial Africa the colony of Middle Congo (now the Republic of the Congo). The land, known as Neukamerun, became part of the German colony of Kamerun, part of German West Africa, although it lasted only briefly because it was captured by the Allies during World War I. As part of the treaty, Germany ceded France a small area of territory to the south-east of Fort Lamy, now part of Chad.

=== Makhzen view ===
In Morocco, when the young Sultan Abdelaziz acceded in 1894 at the age of 16, Europeans became the main advisers at the court and local rulers became more and more independent from the sultan. Sultan Abdelaziz was deposed in 1908. Moroccan law and order continued to deteriorate under his successor, Abdelhafid, who abdicated in favor of his brother Yusef after signing the Treaty of Fez.

Makhzen officials believed the protectorate system in Morocco would resemble British Egypt, with substantial autonomy in domains such as internal administration and justice. However, the Treaty of Fes was modelled after the Treaty of Bardo of 12 May 1881, which made Tunisia a French protectorate and severely limited the Bey's authority.

An interim government, led by Abdelhafid's brother, Ziin al-'Aabidiin, who was promoted sultan in Meknes on 17 April 1911, also put pressure on Abdelhafid.

Eugène Regnault, ministre plénipotentiaire of France in Tangier, arrived in Fes on 24 March after long meetings in Paris with the Treaty of Fes in his possession.

In March 1912, negotiations at the Royal Palace in Fes between Sultan Abd al-Hafid of Morocco and Eugène Regnault were interpreted by Abdelqader Benghabrit, who was then working as the translator at the French Legation in Tangier. The negotiations on 29 March, held with the French military surrounding the city, lasted for 6 hours from 6:00 pm until midnight. They culminated in the signing of the Treaty of Fes, which established the French Protectorate in Morocco on 30 March.

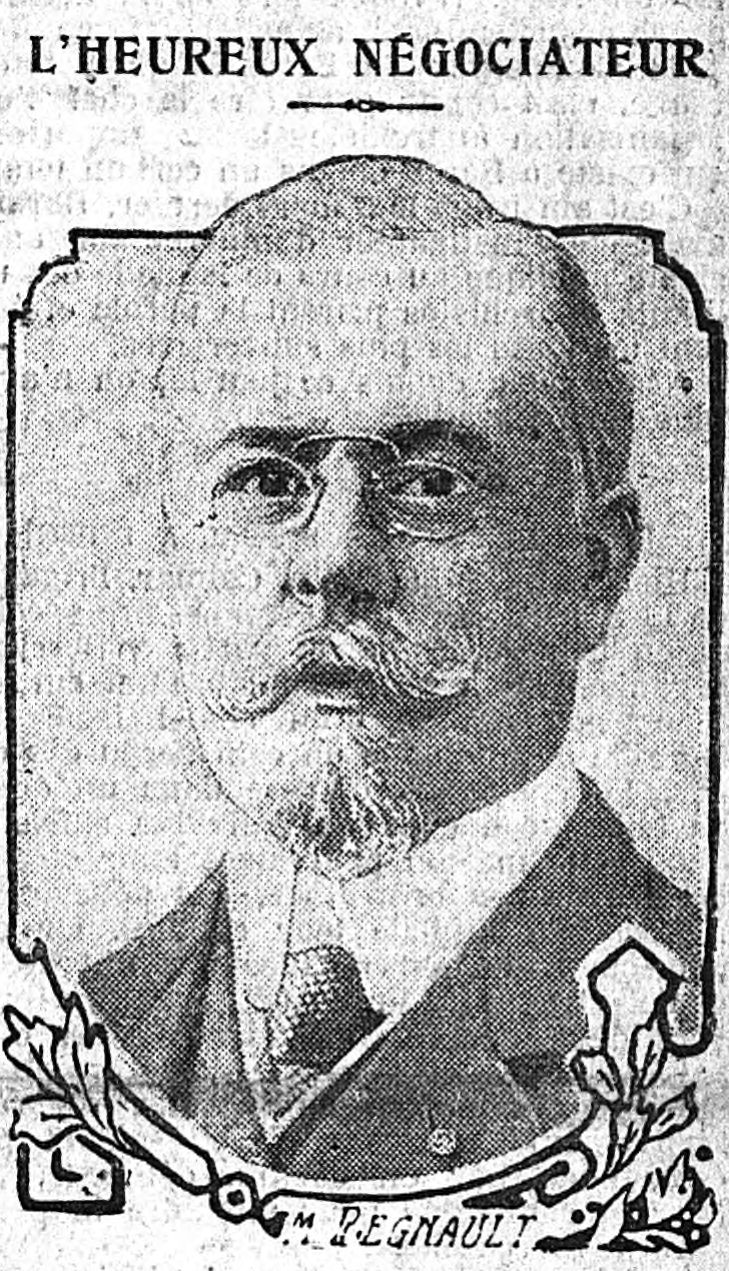
Eugène Regnault, "the fortunate negotiator," on the front page of Le Matin the day after the signature of the Treaty of Fes.

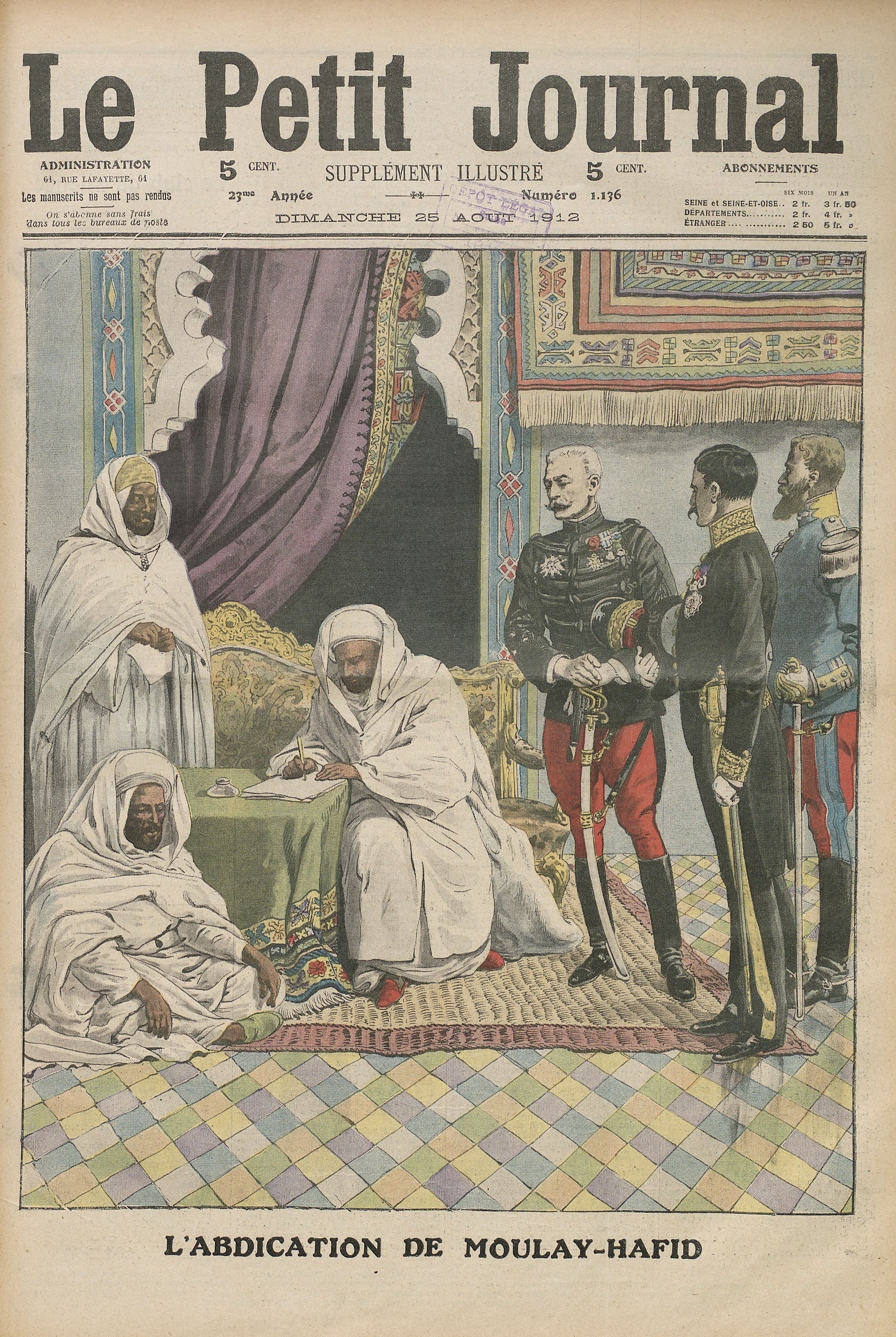
An illustration of Abd al-Hafid signing the Treaty of Fes on the front page of Le Petit Journal's weekly Supplément illustré, printed August 25, 1912.

== Effects ==
France gained authority over non-Moroccan citizens in legislative, military, foreign policy and jurisdictional transactions, though nominally leaving the Moroccan government in control of its own citizens. Moroccan nationalists dispute this, noting that France still influenced Moroccan affairs as a result of the treaty.

The Treaty Between France and Spain Regarding Morocco, concluded on 27 November 1912, established the Spanish protectorate in Morocco. By this agreement, Spain gained a zone of influence in the Rif and the Cape Juby areas, where the Sultan remained nominally the sovereign and was represented by a vice regent under the control of the Spanish high commission. The treaty also granted the concession for exploitation of the iron mines of Mount Uixan to the Spanish Rif Mines Company, which was also given permission to build a railroad to connect the mines with Melilla.

== Moroccan reception ==
=== 1912 Fes riots ===
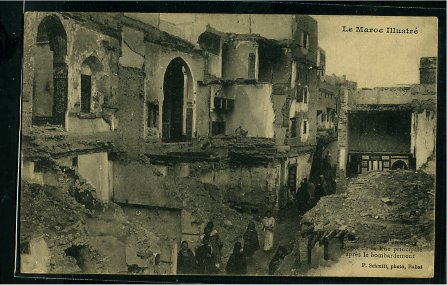
Damage to the Mellah after French artillery fire in the Intifada of Fes.

The treaty was kept secret until, on 17 April, the population of Fes learned of it and riots broke out. Abdelhafid had already left Fes seeking safety in Rabat, but the Mellah, or Jewish quarter, of Fes was bombarded by French artillery and then sacked by tribesmen in Fes for the weekly market. After the violence, Resident General Hubert Lyautey decided to make Rabat the capital instead of Fes.

=== Moroccan resistance ===
Moroccan resistance to French colonialism continued after the Treaty of Fes, with the Zaian War and the Rif War, for example.

== See also ==
- History of Morocco
- Mnebhi Palace—location of the Treaty's signing
- Moroccan Debt Administration
