= Sharifian Empire =

Sharifian Empire may refer to:

- Saadi Sultanate, a state based in present-day Morocco from 1510 to 1659
- Alawi Sultanate, which ruled Morocco from 1666 to 1912
