= Treaty of Wad Ras =

1860 treaty between Morocco and Spain

Treaty of Wad Ras معاهدة واد راس Tratado de Wad-Ras
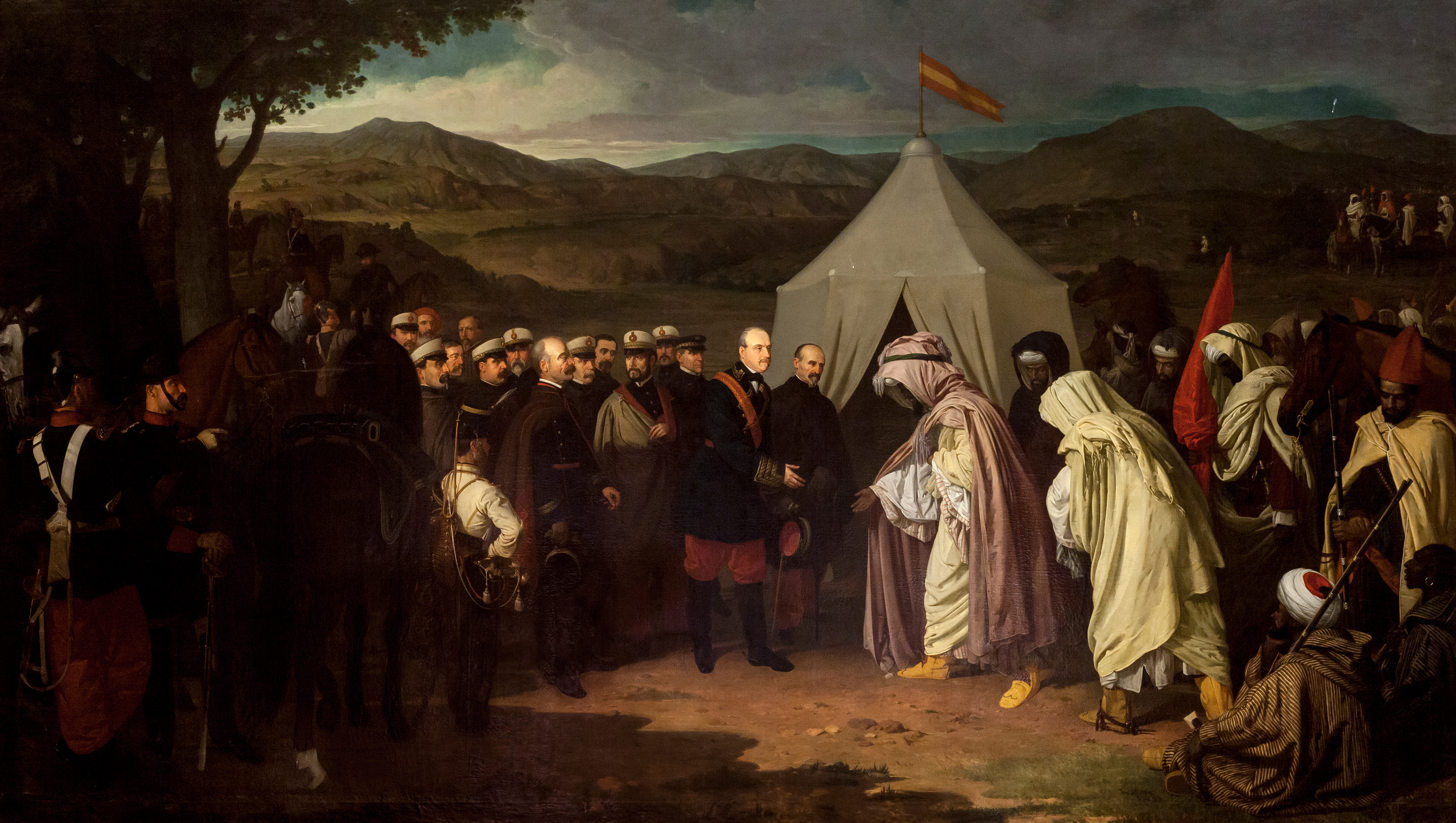
- The Treaty of Wad Ras as portrayed by Joaquín Domínguez Bécquer
- Signed: April 26, 1860
- Location: Wadi Ras, Morocco
- Signatories: (Morocco) Mawlay Abbas (Spain) Leopoldo O'Donnell
- Parties: Morocco; Spain
- Languages: Arabic; Spanish

The Treaty of Wad Ras (Arabic: معاهدة واد راس, Spanish: Tratado de Wad-Ras) was a treaty signed between Morocco and Spain at the conclusion of the War of Tetuan on April 26, 1860, at Wad Ras, located between Tetuan and Tangier. The conditions of the treaty exacerbated Morocco's defeat in the war, with major concessions being granted to Spain. Morocco was forced to pay a 20 million duros (equivalent to $4 million 1861 US dollars) indemnity—far greater the balance of the Makhzen's treasury; the territories of the Spanish exclaves of Ceuta and Melilla were extended further into Moroccan territory; and Sidi Ifni became a Spanish possession.

Following the treaty, the Moroccan government took a massive British loan larger than its national reserves to pay off its war debt to Spain.

== Historical context ==
From 1859 to 1860, Morocco became engaged with the War of Tetuan against Spain. Morocco had recently suffered a major defeat in the Franco-Moroccan War at the hands of the French in 1844. In 1856, the Moroccan government signed the Anglo-Moroccan Treaty, opening up the country to foreign trade while granting several rights to British subjects in Morocco and reducing the control of the Makhzen's over the Moroccan economy.

The Spanish campaign of 1859 came in response to the skirmishes led by local tribes that took place around the Spanish enclaves.

After the Spain's victory over Morocco at the Battle of Tetuan and its conquest of the city in 1860, the Spanish general Leopoldo O'Donnell decided to attack Tangier. The Moroccan army, led by al-Abass Bin Abderrahman, brother of Sultan Muhammad IV, attempted to challenge the attack at Wad Ras, where he suffered a massive defeat. This defeat forced Muhammad IV to sign a peace treaty with major concessions.

== Main provisions ==
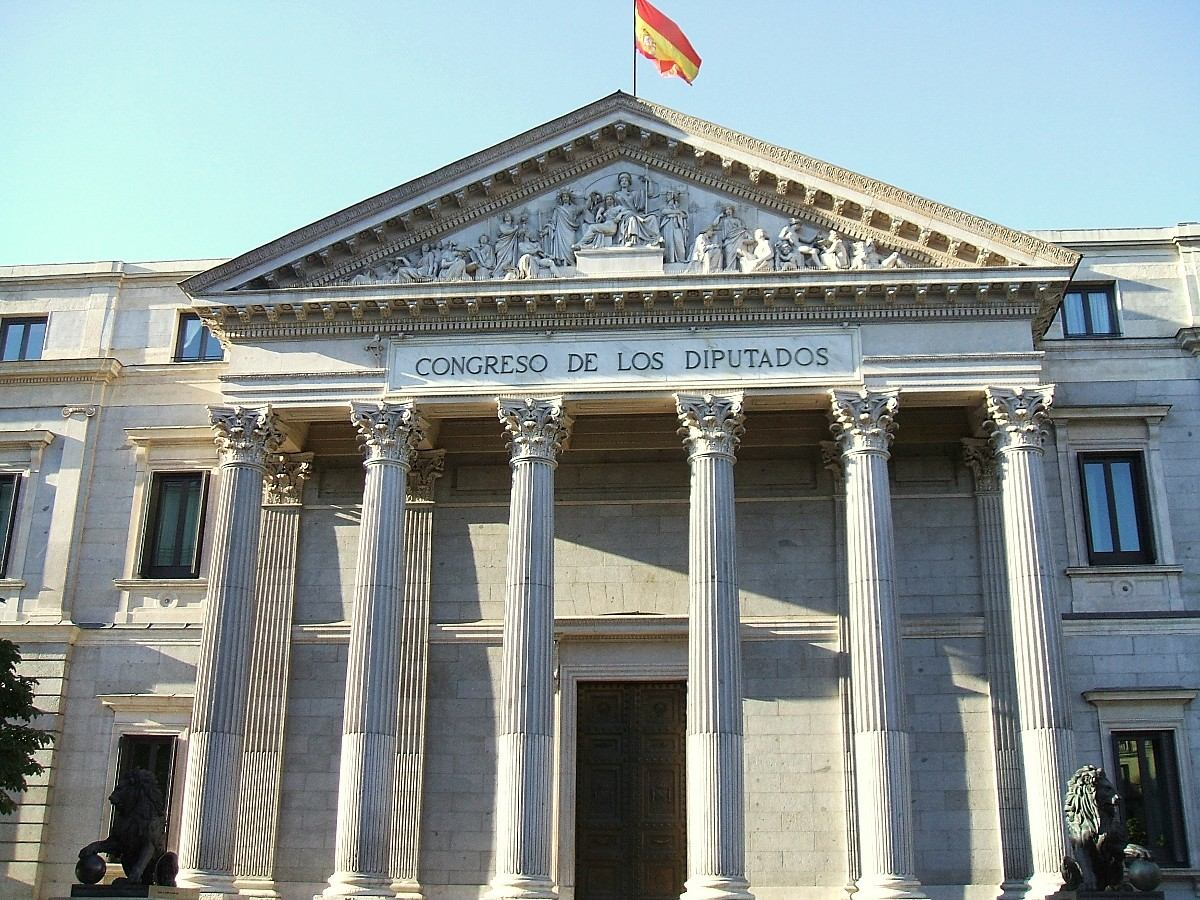
Image of the Spanish parliament building with two lions sculpted from Moroccan canons seized in the Battle of Wad Ras in 1860

- Paying Spain a war indemnity of 20 million duro. (Article 9)
- Continued occupation of Tetuan and the surrounding area until the payment of the indemnity in full. (Article 9)
- Expansion of the territory of Ceuta to the Bullones Mountains and the Anghera Rivine. (Article 3)
- Appointment of a Spanish-Moroccan committee of engineers to draw a precise map of the border. (Article 4)
- Signing the treaty of August 24, 1859, which provided for the expansion of the borders around Melilla, Peñón de Vélez de la Gomera, and Alhucemas Islands the distance of a cannon shot. (Article 5)
- Forcing the Sultan of Morocco to provide security forces led by a general or officer of the Makhzen to protect the Spanish areas from hostile tribes. (Article 6)
- Relinquishing expansive territory surrounding the fort known as Santa Cruz de la Mar Pequeña (now Sidi Ifni) originally built in the period of Isabella I of Castile, located in the south of Morocco. (Article 8)
- Creation of an Evangelist mission in Fes, and forcing Morocco to protect it in its proselytizing activities throughout Morocco. (Article 10)
- Building a Spanish Catholic church in Tetuan after the departure of Spanish forces (Article 11).
- Spain and its North African colonies receiving most favored nation status in trade with Morocco. (Article 13)
- Allowing Spanish colonies in North Africa to freely buy and export lumber harvested from surrounding forests. (Article 15)
- Freeing prisoners of war of both sides. (Article 16)

== Aftermath ==
To help pay the indemnity, Morocco took a loan from private investors in Britain. The loan, issued by Sirs Robinson, Fleming and Philippe P. Blyth, amounted to £501,200, of which the Sultan actually received £426,000. The British loan was to be repaid from half of the tariff revenue collected at Moroccan ports, to be overseen by European agents. The other half of the tariff revenue at Moroccan ports went toward the amount owed directly to Spain.

The annual repayment of the loan represented 12% of Morocco's customs revenues, and it was repaid regularly up until 1882, when the loan was repaid in full and British civil servants left the country.
