= Protégé system =

19th-century privileges in Morocco

The protégé system (Arabic: نظام المحميين) in Morocco in the late 19th century allowed people working for foreign consuls and vice-consuls certain privileges and legal protections not available to the rest of the population, such as exemption from taxes imposed by the Makhzen and protections from a sometimes arbitrary judicial system. At first the status of protégé was available only to Moroccans—Muslims and Jews—but it was extended to Europeans by the 1860s. The protégé system was a parallel to the capitulatory system in the Ottoman Empire.

The Madrid Conference of 1880 was held at the behest of Sultan Hassan I in response to France and Spain's abuse of the protégé system.

== See also ==
- Comprador
- Capitulation (treaty)
- Concession (contract)
