= Treaty of Madrid (1880) =

Treaty giving European powers access to Moroccan lands and resources

- The Treaty of Madrid (1880) was a treaty drafted during an international conference in Madrid upon the request of Sultan Hassan I of Morocco. Governments with interests in Morocco participated. This treaty served to regulate and make European conquests of Moroccan territories official with respect to the international community.

The Treaty of Madrid (1880) was the result of the Conference of Madrid held during 1880 in that city by request of Hassan I, Sultan of Morocco, due to alleged abuses of the protégé system (privileges for Moroccans employed by foreign governments) by the French and Spanish. The treaty resulting was a collection of agreements between the Sultan and several European governments, to give the powers the ownership of Moroccan lands they had seized, the resources present on these lands, settlement rights and to employ locals on these lands. This treaty served to regulate and make these conquests official with respect to the international community.

== Summary ==
The treaty consisted of 18 articles:

Treaties/agreements signed previously, with Britain, Spain and France, remained in effect, with modifications specified by this treaty. Foreign officials residing in Morocco were given permission to employ Moroccans, and enjoyed 'protection', i.e. freedom from taxation, as did their families, some of their Moroccan employees and any Consulate employees who were Moroccan.

Employees who worked as farmers, servants, interpreters or other menial jobs were not protected, even if they were not Moroccan. Any foreign nationals who owned farmed land or were farmers had to pay agricultural tax, and any who owned and used pack animals or load carrying animals had to pay 'gate tax', but in both situations foreign nationals were exempt from other taxes.

Foreign officials could not employ soldiers or Moroccan officials, or Moroccans being prosecuted for crime. Foreign nationals could purchase or obtain land with the prior permission of the Moroccan government, and as such the land would remain in Moroccan jurisdiction. Foreign governments could choose any 12 Moroccans to be protected for whatever reason they desired without permission of the Moroccan government, but had to seek permission if they wanted to protect any more.

The 1863 agreement with Morocco is summarized at the end of the Treaty.

== Attendees ==
- Spain, represented by the President of the Council of Ministers Antonio Cánovas del Castillo.
- Morocco, represented by the Minister of Foreign Affairs Sid Mohamed Vargas (محمد بارقش).
- France, represented by the French Ambassador to Spain, Vice-Admiral Benjamin Jaurès.
- United Kingdom, represented by the Honorable Lionel Sackville-West, 2nd Baron Sackville.
- German Empire, represented by Count Eberhardt of Solms-Sonnewalde.
- Austro-Hungarian Empire, represented by Count Emanuel Ludolf.
- United States, represented by General Lucius Fairchild.
- Belgium, represented by Edward Anspach.
- Kingdom of Italy, represented by Giuseppe Greppi, Count of Greppi.
- Kingdom of the Netherlands, represented by the resident minister Jonkheer Maurice of Heldewier.
- Kingdom of Portugal, represented by José Maria Caldeira, Count of Casal Ribeiro.
- Swedish-Norwegian Union, represented by resident minister Henry Åkerman.
- Kingdom of Denmark, represented by the United Kingdom.

== See also ==
- Alaouite dynasty
- History of Morocco
