= Anglo-Moroccan Treaty of 1856 =

1856 treaty between Morocco and the United Kingdom

- Signed: 9 December 1856
- Location: Tangier, Morocco
- Signatories: (United Kingdom of Great Britain and Ireland) United Kingdom; Sultanate of Morocco
- Languages: English and Arabic

The Anglo-Moroccan Treaty of 1856 was a treaty between Morocco and the United Kingdom signed in Tangier on 9 December 1856. It was signed after lengthy negotiations between John Hay Drummond Hay and Muhammad al-Khatib, representatives of Queen Victoria and Sultan Abd al-Rahman, respectively. This treaty prolonged Morocco's independence but gave major concessions to British interests, and set a precedent.

This treaty was composed of two texts: the first was a general treaty of 38 articles dealing with the status of consuls, and their privileges and their freedom of movement, as well as the settling of British subjects in the country.

The second text was a treaty of commerce with 8 articles. The most important was Article 6, which set the customs tariffs at 10%. The treaty abolished the Makhzen monopoly and definitively opened trade in Morocco.
