= Makhzen =

Governing institution in North Africa

The Makhzen (Arabic: المخزن, Moroccan Arabic: لمخزن, Berber languages: ⵍⵎⵅⵣⵏ, romanized: Lmexzen) is the governing institution in Morocco and in pre-1957 Tunisia, centered on the monarch and consisting of royal notables, top-ranking military personnel, landowners, security service bosses, civil servants and other well-connected members of the establishment. The term "Makhzen" is also popularly used in Morocco as a word meaning "state" or "government".

== Etymology ==
The word makhzen (Arabic: مخزن) literally means "warehouse" in Arabic (from khazana 'to store up'), originally referred to where the sultans's civil servants would receive their wages, but over time makhzen in Moroccan Arabic became synonymous with the elite. It is likely a metonymy related to taxes, which the makhzen used to collect; the term may also refer to the state or its actors, but this usage is increasingly rare and is primarily used by the older generation.

It is the origin of the Spanish and Portuguese almacén and armazém (with addition of the Arabic definite article), meaning warehouse. It was also incorporated into French and Italian as magasin (meaning 'store') and magazzino. It came into the English language from Middle French as magazine, originally referring to a storehouse for ammunition and later to publications. With the "store" meaning, it was also adopted from French into Russian as Магазин and into Romanian as magazin.

== Makhzen in Morocco ==
The Makhzen is a very ancient notion in Morocco, it roughly coincides with the notion of the feudal state predating the French protectorate in Morocco. Bilād al-makhzen ('the land of the makhzen') was the term for the areas under central government authority, while those areas still run by tribal authority were known as bilād as-siba ('the land of dissidence'). Hubert Lyautey, who served as resident-general of Morocco from 1912 until 1925 during the era of the protectorate, was a fervent proponent of indirect colonisation, especially in Berber-speaking areas. Lyautey maintained the role of the Makhzen and even enhanced it by giving important roles to local notables such as Thami El Glaoui. Local notables acted as a relay between the population and the French authorities.

=== Post-Arab Spring ===
Since the Arab Spring, the Makhzen system has been forced to evolve in order to adapt to calls for reform but has continued to operate. Whilst the 2011 constitutional reforms in Morocco nominally handed more power to elected officials the monarchy controlled these reforms and ensured that they did not remove it from the political sphere. The Makhzen system has remained important in the informal working of the Moroccan Parliament. The process of government formation has forced political parties to include within their ranks those with close ties to the palace, as the palace remained highly active in coalition negotiations so as to ensure the government they wanted was formed. In order to gain power political parties may not criticise the Makhzen system, accuse the monarchy of operating a deep state or take any actions that could contradict the palace's positions on any issue in which the king has spoken directly. Meanwhile the monarchy has retained control over certain ministries in the government, preventing the PM from fully appointing their own cabinet, and has retained control over the security council.

== See also ==
- Auxiliary Forces (Mokhzani)
- Network monarchy
- List of Moroccan royal residences, often referred to as Dar al-Makhzen
