= Reparation Commission =

Body established by the Treaty of Versailles

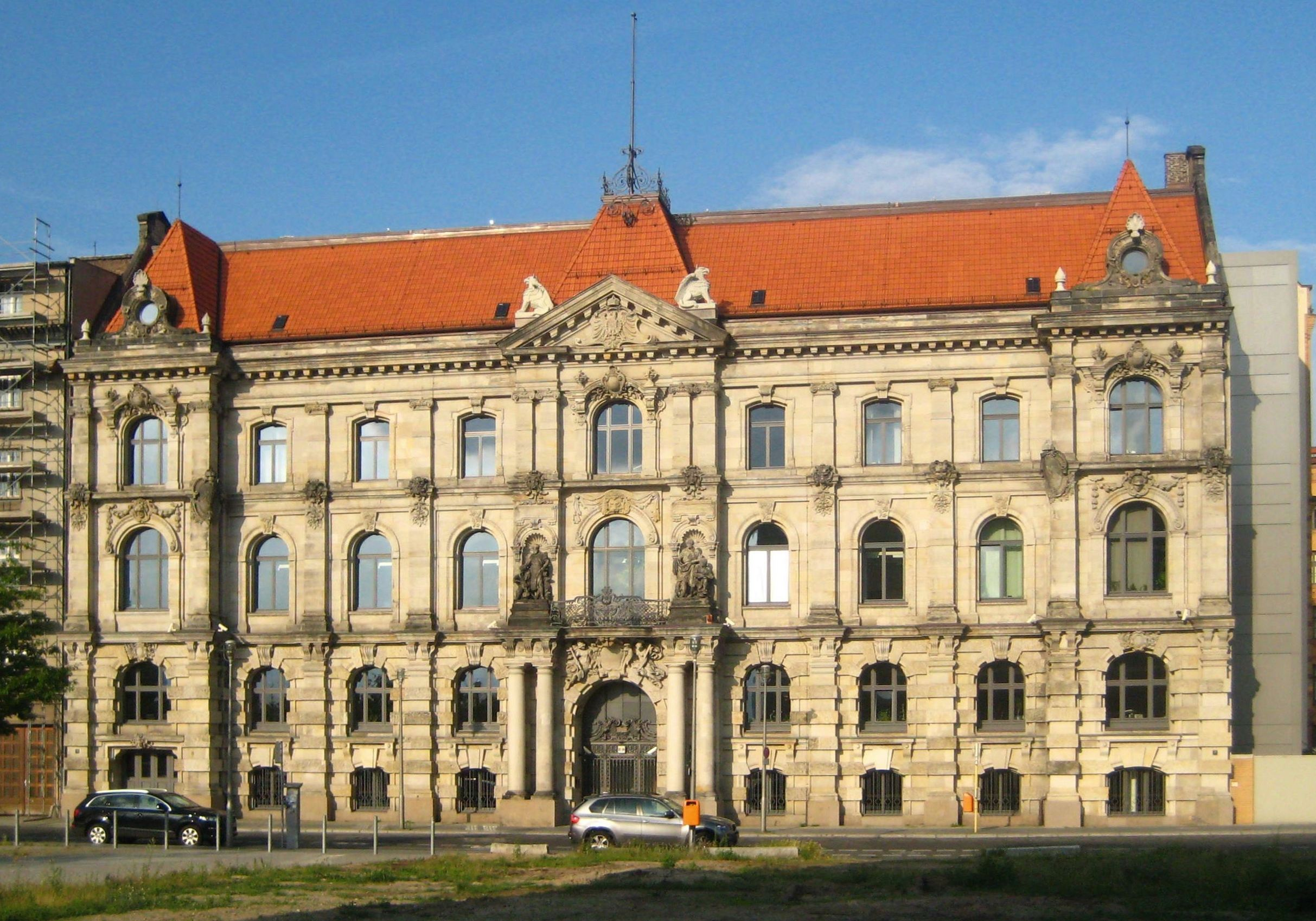
Former Imperial Patent Office building at Luisenstrasse 33 in Berlin, the German office of the Agent General for Reparation Payments until 1930

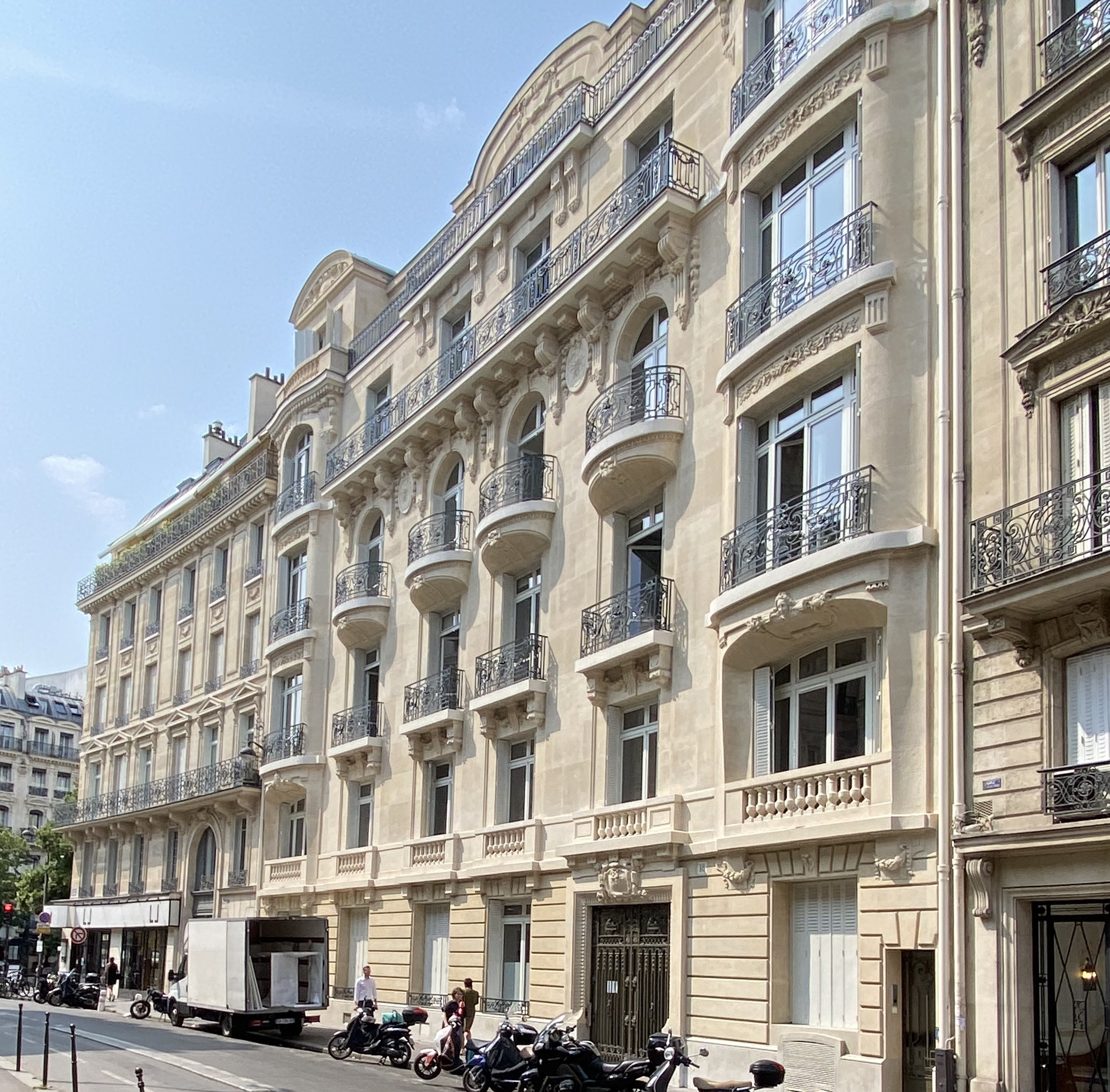
Building at 18, rue de Tilsitt in Paris, the Agent General's French office 1925-1930

The Reparation Commission, also Inter-Allied Reparation Commission (sometimes "Reparations Commission"), was established by the Treaty of Versailles to determine the level of World War I reparations which Germany should pay the victorious Allies. It promptly approved a plan for the apportionment of Austrian-Hungarian debt to the successor states that had been proposed by Ludwig von Mises, and its remit was broadened to reparations by other central powers, namely Austria (by the Treaty of Saint-Germain-en-Laye), Bulgaria (treaty of Neuilly-sur-Seine), and Hungary (Treaty of Trianon).

The Commission relied on a General Secretariat and on General Services, both headquartered in Paris. It was restructured and downsized in late 1924 as a consequence of the Dawes Plan, and eventually disbanded in 1930 following the adoption of the Young Plan and the establishment of the Bank for International Settlements (BIS). The BIS took over the residual activity of the Agent General for Reparation Payments, until the reparations themselves effectively ended by the mid-1930s.

== Membership ==
Seven nations were represented at the Reparation Commission, namely Belgium, France, Italy, Japan, the Kingdom of Serbs, Croats and Slovenes, the United Kingdom, and the United States. Since the U.S. had not ratified the Treaty of Versailles, however, their representatives had no official status. Each of the seven nations appointed a delegate and a deputy delegate. Only Belgium, France, Italy and the UK had an unconditional vote.

== Leadership ==
The Commission elected a chair among the delegates for a renewable one-year term. The first chair elected in 1920 was France's Raymond Poincaré.

Arthur Salter was appointed the first Secretary General to the commission, a position he held from 1920 to 1922. He was succeeded by Andrew McFadyean from 1922 to 1924.

== Agent General for Reparation Payments ==
Owen D. Young was the first Agent General for Reparation Payments tasked with overseeing Germany's payments, and was succeeded in October 1924 by Seymour Parker Gilbert who held the role until 1930. Gilbert's Paris office was initially hosted by the investment bank Morgan, Harjes & Co. From early 1925 onwards, he worked from two offices, respectively in Paris (18, rue de Tilsitt) and Berlin (Luisenstrasse 33).

== See also ==
- Ottoman Public Debt Administration
- Moroccan Debt Administration
