= International Financial Commission =

Supervision of the public finances of Greece imposed by European powers

The International Financial Commission (French: Commission Internationale Financière de la Grèce) was a six-person commission established in 1898 to enforce repayment of sovereign debt by the Kingdom of Greece to its creditors. It is often referred to in Greece as the instrument of International Financial Control (Greek: Διεθνής Οικονομικός Έλεγχος), an expression that refers generally to the foreign supervision of the country's public finances.

== Background and precedent international practice ==
Between 1857 and 1859, the UK, France and Russia created the International Financial Commission of Inquiry, a commission whose goal was reporting Greece's capability of repaying the debt of 1833. This commission, by the intervention of Russia, did not have the role of controlling the economy and ensuring payments; it was restricted to an advisory role. The result from the work of this commission was the payment of an instalment amounting to 900,000 French francs in 1860.

Ottoman Tunisia bankrupted in 1869 in a similar economic situation. In order to collect its debts, the Commission Financière Internationale was established in the country by its creditors: France, UK and Italy. This committee was responsible for the management of state finances to ensure the repayment of Tunisian debts.

The Ottoman Empire defaulted similarly in 1875 and on 20 December 1881, with the Decree of Muharram agreed to the creation of the Ottoman Public Debt Administration (OPDA), a debt collecting organization with 5,000 employees. OPDA had more than twenty offices in the provinces of the empire, from Yemen to Thessaloniki, with complete freedom in deciding the debt collection manner, and attributed the debts to the creditor countries.

== Bankruptcy of Greece and defeat in the Greco-Turkish War of 1897 ==
In 1893, the government of Greek Prime Minister Charilaos Trikoupis declared bankruptcy. Partial control, which was typical and insubstantial, was imposed by the country's creditors without having the power to interfere in the Greek public finances. The Greek government, over half of whose revenue went in 1893 to service loans, was in addition beset by clientelism. Several years of fruitless negotiations followed. The first modern Olympic Games (held in 1896) increased state expenses.

The situation changed when Greece clashed with Turkey during the Greco-Turkish War of 1897. Greece was in a difficult position, with its armed forces unable to stop the advance of the Turkish army, which had captured Thessaly and part of Central Greece. The country was forced to accept defeat on 4 December 1897, with the Treaty of Constantinople. The treaty put forward the condition that Greece had to pay Turkey the sum of 4,000,000 Ottoman liras, as immediate war reparation. The government of Alexandros Zaimis was forced to negotiate additional loans with the country's creditors, with the disadvantageous precedent of bankruptcy.

The negotiations led to the imposition of the International Financial Control for the financial restructuring of Greece and the subsequent guarantee that the country would be able to pay back its loans, old and new.

== Lending terms ==
The negotiations with the creditors' representatives (UK, France, Austria-Hungary, German Empire, Russia and Italy) started in October 1897 and resulted in the instatement of Law 2519/23-2-1898, according to which the International Financial Commission was established and subsequently renamed.

The agreement provided for the following:

1. Issuing a war reparations loan and an "economic loan". A guaranteed loan of 151,300,000 French francs was given to Greece by the Great Powers. The loan was used to pay 93,900,000 francs to the Ottoman Empire as war reparations, the current state debt of 31,400,000 francs, the 1897 deficit of 22,500,000 francs and the loan issuing expenses of 3,500,000 francs.
2. Mortgaging tax incomes to repay the loans. To do that, the Commission acquired regular sources of income and assessed the state agencies for their efficiency and their tax collecting ability. The Commission collected the incomes from the monopolies of salt, oil, matches, playing cards, cigarette papers and Naxos emery, the tobacco tax, the stamp duties and impounded duties from the Port of Piraeus.
3. Debt restructuring.

== 20th century ==
The IFC remained in Athens until 1936. It played a key role in the administration of the League of Nations lending in the 1920s under the aegis of the League's Economic and Financial Organization. According to some observers, the experience was not wholly negative for public administration, as it allowed the state to increase revenues, and reduced the outflow and misappropriation of capital.

== See also ==
- Troika (European group), debt management commission during the Euro area crisis
- Caisse de la Dette in the Khedivate of Egypt
- Ottoman Public Debt Administration in the Ottoman Empire
- Moroccan Debt Administration in the Sultanate of Morocco

== Sources ==
- "Το ιστορικό του "δυστυχώς, επτωχεύσαμεν"" [The history of "unfortunately, we bankrupted"] (in Greek). Greece: Rizospastis. 8 December 1996. p. 12.
- "Η επιβολή του Διεθνούς Οικονομικού Ελέγχου" [The imposition of the International Financial Control] (in Greek). Greece: Rizospastis. 6 December 1996. p. 12.
- Siatras, Giannis (11 February 2010). "Διεθνής Οικονομικός Έλεγχος: 112 χρόνια από την (προηγούμενη) επιβολή του!" [International Financial Control: 112 years from its (last) imposition!] (in Greek). Greece: eurocapital.gr.
- Diamantis, Apostolos (2 May 2010). "Από τη χρεοκοπία του 1893 στο Διεθνή Οικονομικό Ελεγχο" [From the bankruptcy of 1893 to the International Financial Control] (in Greek). Greece: Eleftherotypia.
- "Ο Διεθνής Οικονομικός Έλεγχος του 1898 (η Ιστορία επαναλαμβάνεται;)" [The Financial Economic Control of 1898 (History repeats itself?)] (in Greek). Greece: tvxs. 28 July 2011.
- Waibel, M., Echoes of History: The International Financial Commission in Greece in C Paulus (Ed), "Sovereign Default – Do We Need a Legal Procedure?" (C.H. Beck/Hart: May 2014)
