= Moroccan rial =

Former Moroccan currency

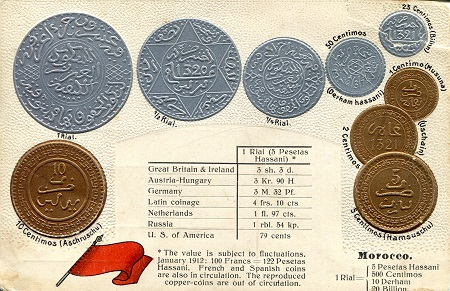
Early 1900s postcard with Rials

The rial was the currency of Morocco between 1880 and 1921. It was subdivided into 10 dirham, each of 50 mazunas.

== History ==
The rial was introduced when Morocco adopted a modern style coinage in 1882. It replaced a system consisting of copper falus, silver dirham and gold benduqi.

In Spanish Morocco, the rial was replaced by the Spanish peseta in 1912 at a rate of 1 rial = 5 pesetas. In French Morocco, the rial was replaced in 1921 by the franc at a rate of 1 rial = 10 francs.

== Coins ==
In 1882, silver 1/2, 1, 2 1/2 and 5 dirham and 1 rial coins were issued whilst, in 1902, bronze 1, 2, 5 and 10 mazunas were introduced. Although there were several design changes, these denominations remained otherwise unchanged until 1921.

== Banknotes ==
The only paper money issued denominated in rial were issued by the State Bank of Morocco between 1910 and 1917. These were also denominated in francs, with denominations of 4 rials (40 francs) and 20 rials (200 francs).

== See also ==
- Falus
- Moroccan dirham
