= Moroccan dirham =

Currency of Morocco

الدرهم المغربي (Arabic); ⴰⴷⵔⵀⵎ ⴰⵎⵖⵔⵉⴱⵉ (Standard Moroccan Tamazight)
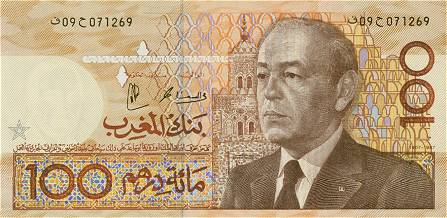
- 100 Dirham Note

ISO 4217
- Code: MAD (numeric: 504)
- Subunit: 0.01

Units of account
- Symbol: DH
- Subunit
- 1/20: rial (informal)
- 1/100: santim (official) franc (informal)
- Plural
- santim (official) franc (informal): santimat

Denominations
- Banknotes: 20, 50, 100, 200 dirhams
- Coins: ½, 1, 2, 5 & 10 dirhams
- Rarely used: 1, 5, 10, & 20 santimat

Demographics
- Replaced: Moroccan franc
- User(s): Morocco; Western Sahara

Issuance
- Central bank: Bank Al-Maghrib (Bank of Morocco)
- Website: www.bkam.ma

Valuation
- Inflation: 0.2%
- Source: The World Factbook, 2019 est.
- Pegged with: 60% EUR and 40% USD

The Moroccan dirham (Arabic: درهم, romanized: dirham, Moroccan Arabic: درهم, romanized: derhem; sign: DH; code: MAD; Standard Moroccan Tamazight: ⴷⵔⵀⵎ) is the official monetary currency of Morocco. It is issued by the Bank Al-Maghrib, the central bank of Morocco. One Moroccan dirham is subdivided into 100 santimat (singular: santim; Arabic: سنتيم).

== History ==
The word dirham derives from the Greek currency, the drachma. The Idrissid dirham, a silver coin, was minted in Morocco under the Idrisid dynasty from the 8th to 10th centuries.

Before the introduction of a modern coinage in 1882, Morocco issued copper coins denominated in falus, silver coins denominated in dirham, and gold coins denominated in benduqi. From 1882, the dirham became a subdivision of the Moroccan rial, with 500 Mazunas = 10 dirham = 1 rial.

When most of Morocco became a French protectorate in 1912 it switched to the Moroccan franc. The dirham was reintroduced on 16 October 1960. It replaced the franc as the major unit of currency but, until 1974, the franc continued to circulate, with 1 dirham = 100 francs. In 1974, the centime replaced the franc.

In 2015, the Central Bank updated the weights of the peg to 60% for the euro and 40% for the US dollar, against respectively 80% and 20% previously, to better reflect the current structure of foreign trade of the country.

On 24 November 2023, along with a wide variety of coinage, Bank Al-Maghrib unveiled a new series of banknotes and coins, which included a 100 dirham banknote.

== Coins ==
In 1960, silver 1 dirham coins were introduced. These were followed by nickel 1 dirham and silver 5 dirham coins in 1965. In 1974, with the introduction of the santim, a new coinage was introduced in denominations of 1, 5, 10, 20 and 50 santimat and the 1 and 5 dirham coins. The 1 santim coins were aluminium, the 5 up to 20 santimat were minted in brass, with the highest three denominations in cupro-nickel. New cupro-nickel 5 dirham coins were added in 1980 and changed to a bi-metal coin in 1987. The bi-metal coins bear two year designations for the issue date—1987 in the Gregorian calendar and the 1407 in the Islamic calendar.

The 1 santim was only minted until 1987 when new designs were introduced, with a 1/2 dirham replacing the 50 santimat without changing the size or composition. The new 5 dirham coin was bimetallic, as was the 10 dirham coin introduced in 1995. Cupro-nickel 2 dirham coins were introduced in 2002.

=== 2011 series ===
On 26 July 2011 the Dar As-Sikkah (the Moroccan Mint) announced the introduction of a new series of coins in six denominations. The first, 1/2 and 1 dirham, were released on 28 July to mark Throne Day. The other denominations entered circulation on 6 November to mark the commemoration of the Green March and Independence Day.

Also This series no longer included 5 santims and 2 dirham coins. The production of 2 dirham coins was ceased to avoid confusion with the 1 dirham coins and the 5 santims due to inflation.

Coins of the 2011 series
Image	Value	Technical parameters			Description			Date of			
Image	Value	Diameter	Mass	Composition	Edge	Obverse	Reverse	minting	issue	withdrawal	lapse
	10 santimat	20 mm	3.0 g	Brass-plated steel	Reeded	Bee and saffron flower	Coat of arms of Morocco	2011-2023	6 November 2011	Current	
	20 santimat	23 mm	4.0 g	Brass-plated steel	Reeded	Water lilies and water conservation	Coat of arms of Morocco	2011-2023	6 November 2011	Current	
	1/2 dirham	21 mm	4.0 g	Nickel-plated steel	Reeded	Fish, coral, marine life protection	Coat of arms of Morocco	2011-2023	28 July 2011	Current	
	1 dirham	24 mm	6.0 g	Nickel-plated steel	Reeded	National sovereignty, (Coat of arms of Morocco)	King Mohammed VI	2011-2023	28 July 2011	Current	
	5 dirhams	25 mm	7.5 g	Nordic gold center in cupronickel ring	Segmented reeding	Hassan II Mosque in Casablanca, latent image as security feature	King Mohammed VI	2011-2023	6 November 2011	Current	
	10 dirhams	27 mm	9.0 g	Copper-nickel center in nordic gold ring	Grooves with engraved stars	Kalaat M'Gouna, latent image as security feature	King Mohammed VI	2011-2023	6 November 2011	Current	
These images are to scale at 2.5 pixels per millimetre. For table standards, see the coin specification table.

=== 2023 series ===
On 24 November 2023 the Bank Al-Maghrib announced that a new series of coins would be released the same day. Their obverse design is centered on different themes related to Morrocco’s culture, economy and history.

Coins of the 2023 series
Image	Value	Technical parameters			Description			Date of			
Image	Value	Diameter	Mass	Composition	Edge	Obverse	Reverse	minting	issue	withdrawal	lapse
	10 santimat	20 mm	3.0 g	Brass-plated steel	Reeded	Agriculture (olives)	Coat of arms of Morocco	2023	24 November 2023	Current	
	20 santimat	23 mm	4.0 g	Brass-plated steel	Reeded	Sustainable development and the environment (wind turbines, solar panels)	Coat of arms of Morocco	2023	24 November 2023	Current	
	1/2 dirham	21 mm	4.0 g	Nickel-plated steel	Reeded	Cultural diversity (jewellery)	Coat of arms of Morocco	2023	24 November 2023	Current	
	1 dirham	24 mm	6.0 g	Nickel-plated steel	Reeded	National sovereignty (Coat of arms of Morocco)	King Mohammed VI	2023	24 November 2023	Current	
	5 dirhams	25 mm	7.5 g	Nordic gold center in cupronickel ring	Segmented reeding	The development of Moroccan Western Sahara (Place Mechouar in Laayoune)	King Mohammed VI	2023	24 November 2023	Current	
	10 dirhams	27 mm	9.0 g	Copper-nickel center in nordic gold ring	Grooves with engraved stars	Development and infrastructure (Mohammed VI Bridge and high speed train)	King Mohammed VI	2023	24 November 2023	Current	
These images are to scale at 2.5 pixels per millimetre. For table standards, see the coin specification table.

== Banknotes ==
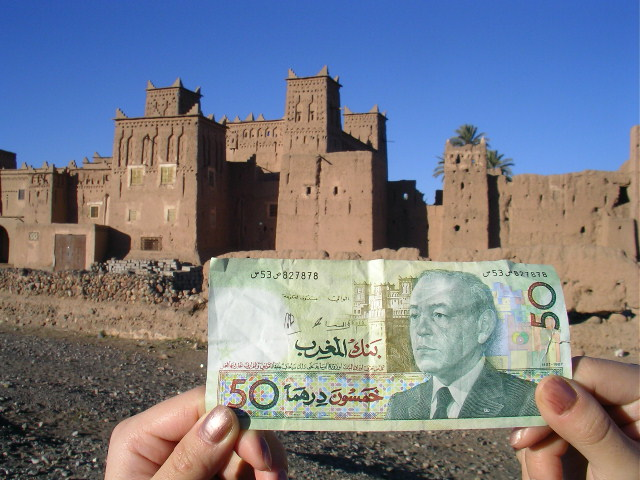
Older 50 dirhams and Ksour in the background

The first notes denominated in dirham were overprints on earlier franc notes, in denominations of 50 dirhams (on 5,000 francs) and 100 dirhams (on 10,000 francs). In 1965, new notes were issued for 5, 10 and 50 dirhams. 100 dirham notes were introduced in 1970, followed by 200 dirham notes in 1991 and 20 dirham notes in 1996. 5 dirham notes were replaced by coins in 1980, with the same happening to 10 dirham notes in 1995. In mid-October 2009, Bank Al-Maghrib issued four million 50-dirham banknotes to commemorate the bank's 50th anniversary. The commemorative note measures 147 × 70 mm and features the portraits of Kings Mohammed VI, Hassan II, and Mohammed V. The back of the notes features the headquarters of Bank Al-Maghrib in Rabat. The speech delivered in 1959 by Mohammed V at the opening of Bank Al-Maghrib is microprinted on the back.

In December 2012, Bank Al-Maghrib issued a 25-dirham banknote to commemorate the 25th anniversary of banknote production at the Moroccan State Printing Works, Dar As-Sikkah. It is the first banknote in the world to be printed on Durasafe, a paper-polymer-paper composite substrate produced by Landqart AG. The front of the commemorative note features an intaglio vignette and a watermark of King Mohammed VI, and a magenta-green color shift security thread. The thread, like the watermark, is embedded inside the banknote yet visible behind a one-sided Viewsafe polymer window. It also has a fully transparent polymer window embossed with the King's royal crest. The back of the note carries a print vignette commemorating 25 years of banknote printing at the Moroccan State Printing Works, Dar As-Sikkah. The windows in Durasafe are formed by die cutting each side of the three layer composite substrate separately. One-sided Viewsafe windows give a clear view inside the substrate where the thread and the watermark of King Mohammed VI are protected, but fully visible behind the polymer core. The transparent Thrusafe window is created by die-cutting both the outer paperlayers to reveal only the transparent polymer core.

On August 15, 2013, Bank Al-Maghrib has announced a new series of banknotes. The notes feature a portrait of King Mohammed VI and the royal crown. Each of the notes show a Moroccan door to the left of the portrait, demonstrating the richness of the country's architectural heritage, and symbolizing the openness of the country.

In 2019, Bank Al-Maghrib issued a 20-dirham banknote produced on polymer substrate to commemorate the 20th anniversary of the accession of Mohammed VI to the Moroccan throne.

A new series of banknotes was issued in 2023–2024.

Banknotes of the Moroccan dirham
1987 Series (Including 1991 Revision)
Value	Dimensions	Obverse	Reverse	Main Colour	Description			Date of	
Value	Dimensions	Obverse	Reverse	Main Colour	Obverse	Reverse	Watermark	printing	issue
10 dirhams	143 × 70 mm			Yellow and pink (1987) violet (1991)	Hassan II	Moroccan lute, pillar	Hassan II	1987	1987/ca. 1991
50 dirhams	148 × 70 mm			Green	Hassan II	A fantasia scene	Hassan II	1987	1987/ca. 1991
100 dirhams	153 × 75 mm			Brown	Hassan II	The Green March into the Spanish Sahara (October, 1975), Desert rose	Hassan II	1987	1987/ca. 1991
200 dirhams	158 × 75 mm			Blue	Hassan II	Conch shell, a branch of coral, and a Dhow.	Hassan II	1987	ca. 1991
1996 Series
20 dirhams	130 × 68 mm			Brown-reddish	Hassan II, Great mosque of Casablanca	Wall fountain of the Hassan II Mosque	Hassan II	1996	
2002 Series
20 dirhams	140 × 70 mm			Violet	Mohammed VI, "Bab Challah" (Challah gate) in Rabat	A panoramical view of the Oudayas	Mohammed VI and "20"	2005	
50 dirhams	147 × 70 mm			Green	Mohammed VI	A clay-made building (Ksour)	Mohammed VI and "50"	2002	
100 dirhams	150 × 78 mm			Brown	Mohammed VI, Mohammed V and Hassan II	The Green March into the Spanish Sahara (October, 1975)	Mohammed VI and "100"	2002	
200 dirhams	158 × 78 mm			Blue	Mohammed VI and Hassan II, Grand mosque of Casablanca	A window of the Hassan II Mosque, Lighthouse of Casablanca (Pointe el-Hank)	Mohammed VI and "200"	2002	
2013 Series
20 dirhams	131 × 70 mm			Purple, orange and blue	Mohammed VI, coat of arms of Morocco	Train crossing Hassan II Bridge over the Bou Regreg river in Rabat; Hassan II Mosque and city buildings in Casablanca	Mohammed VI and electrotype 20	2012	2013
50 dirhams	138 × 70 mm			Green, yellow and blue	Mohammed VI, coat of arms of Morocco	Ouzoud Falls; argan tree, fruit, and bird	Mohammed VI and electrotype 50	2012	2013
100 dirhams	145 × 70 mm			Brown, yellow, violet and blue	Mohammed VI, coat of arms of Morocco	Sahrawi tent; wind turbine farm; three camels with riders on a desert	Mohammed VI and electrotype 100	2012	2012
200 dirhams	151 × 70 mm			Blue, green and violet	Mohammed VI, coat of arms of Morocco	Cargo ship, gantry cranes, and shipping containers in the port of Tangier; lighthouse and trees on Cape Spartel in Tangier	Mohammed VI and electrotype 200	2012	2012
2023 Series
20 dirhams	130 × 70 mm			Purple, orange, red, and blue	Mohammed VI, coat of arms of Morocco, Al Quaraouiyine University in Fes	Aït Benhaddou Fortress, Mohammed VI Art Museum, Grand Theatre in Rabat	Mohammed VI and electrotype 20	2023	2024
50 dirhams	137 × 70 mm			Green, yellow, pink, and blue	Mohammed VI, coat of arms of Morocco, Ouzoud Falls	Ouirgane dam, Desalination station in Agadir, saffron flowers	Mohammed VI and electrotype 50	2023	2024
100 dirhams	144 × 70 mm			Brown, yellow, red, and blue	Mohammed VI; coat of arms of Morocco; Hassan II Mosque	Place Mechouar, Casablanca; Feast of Moussem de Tan Tan	Mohammed VI and electrotype 100	2023	2023
200 dirhams	151 × 70 mm			Blue, orange, yellow, and violet	Mohammed VI; coat of arms of Morocco; Mohammed VI Bridge	Marrakesh Menara Airport; Mohammed VI Tower	Mohammed VI and electrotype 200	2023	2024
For table standards, see the banknote specification table.

== Popular denominations and usage ==
Popular denominations are words widely used in Morocco to refer to different values of the currency; they are not considered official by the state. Those include the rial (Arabic pronunciation: [rjal]), equivalent to 5 santimat, and the franc [frˤɑnk], equivalent to 1 santim. Usually, when dealing with goods with a value lower than a dirham, it is common to use the rial or santim. For very high priced goods, such as cars, it is normal to refer to the price in santimat. However, rial is used when speaking in Arabic and centime when speaking in French.

Though not used by the young generation, the denomination 1,000, 2,000, up to 100,000 francs will be used by people who lived during the French colonial period when referring to 10, 20 and 1,000 dirham. Likewise, the rial is also used for higher value goods than portions of the dirham, reaching 5,000 dhs (100,000 rial). This denomination is used in a Moroccan Arabic speaking context.

== Exchange rates ==
The exchange rate of the Moroccan dirham is determined within a band of fluctuation of ± 5 percent compared to a central rate established by the central bank of Morocco on the basis of a currency basket composed of the euro and United States dollar by up to 60% and 40% respectively.

As of 2025 the Moroccan Dirham is still not freely convertible on world financial markets. The full integration of the Moroccan economy into the world market is hindered by the underdeveloped Moroccan currency system.

The Moroccan dirham is also accepted in trade markets in Ceuta, although the euro is the sole legal tender there.

Current MAD exchange rates
From Google Finance:	AUD CAD CHF CNY EUR GBP HKD JPY USD
From Yahoo! Finance:	AUD CAD CHF CNY EUR GBP HKD JPY USD
From XE.com:	AUD CAD CHF CNY EUR GBP HKD JPY USD
From OANDA:	AUD CAD CHF CNY EUR GBP HKD JPY USD

== See also ==
- Economy of Morocco
- United Arab Emirates dirham
