= State Bank of Morocco =

Morocco quasi-central bank established in 1907

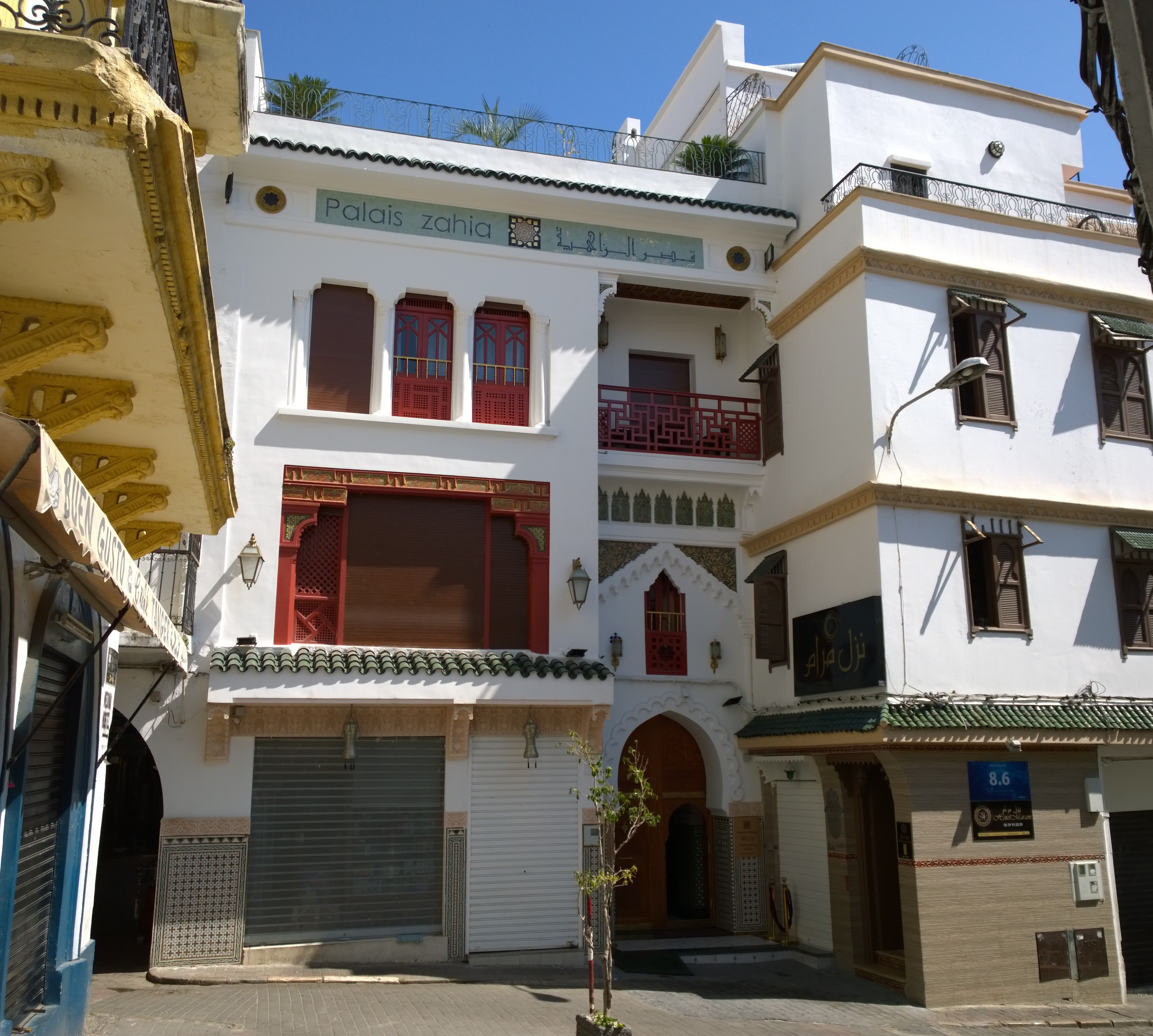
Palais Zahia building in the medina of Tangier, the State Bank of Morocco's head office from 1907 to 1952

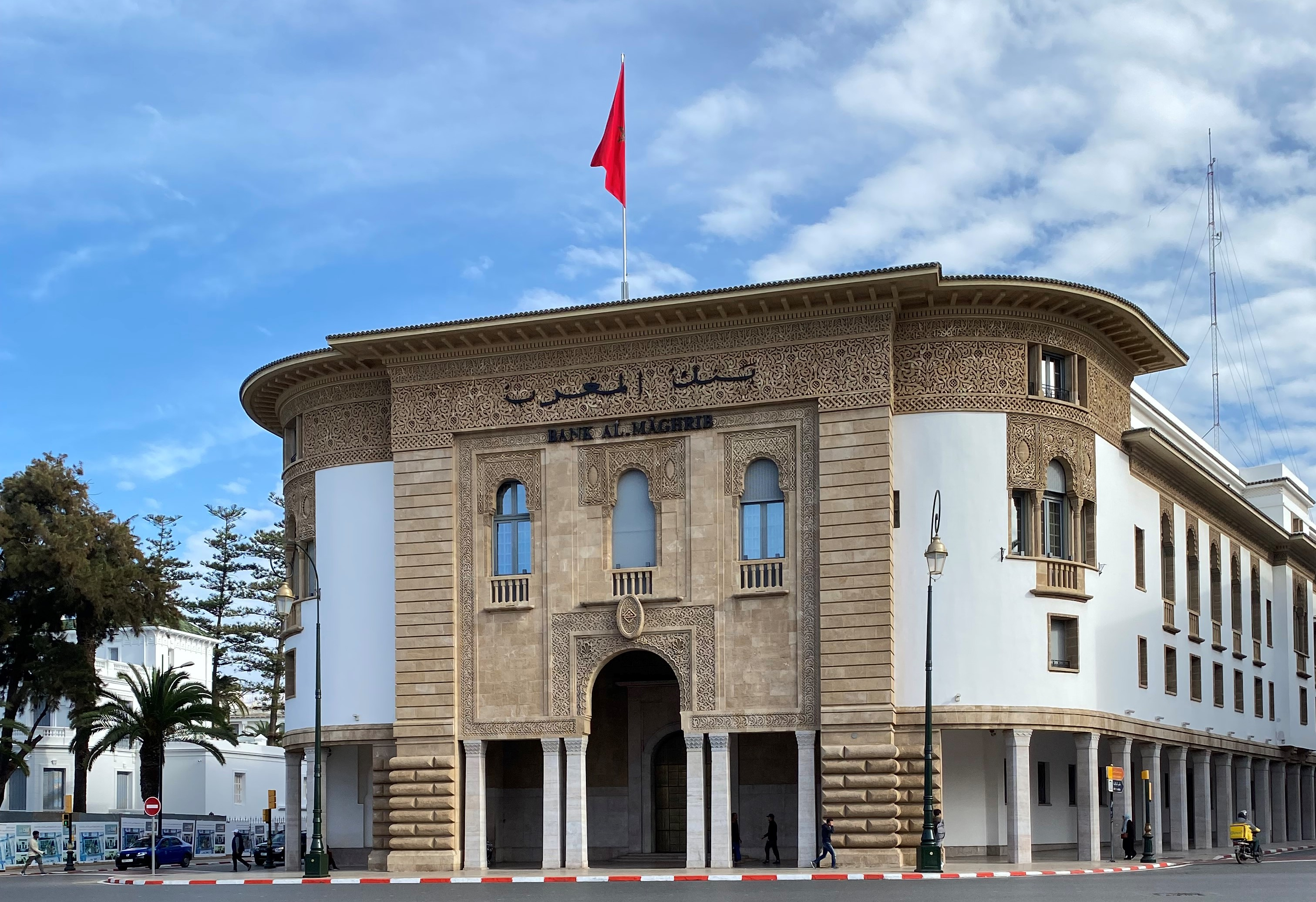
The State Bank's building in Rabat, inaugurated 1925 and the seat of its executive management until succession by Bank Al-Maghrib in 1959

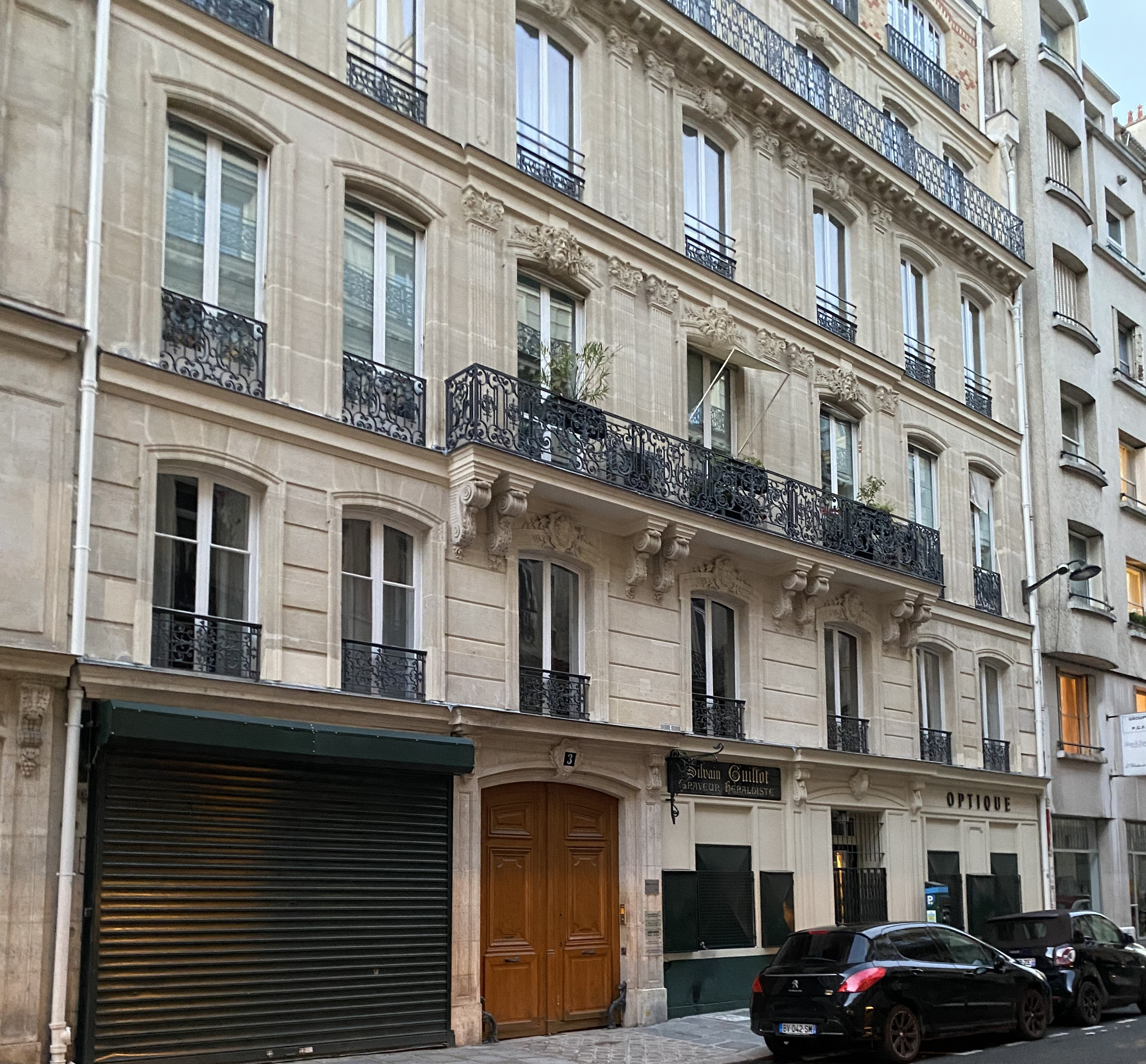
Building at 3, rue Volney in Paris, the State Bank of Morocco's "seat of administration" where board meetings were held from 1907 to 1922

The State Bank of Morocco (French: Banque d'État du Maroc) was a quasi-central bank established in 1907 following the Algeciras Conference, to stabilize the Moroccan currency and serve as a vehicle for European and especially French influence in the Sultanate of Morocco. Following the independence of Morocco, it was replaced in 1959 by the newly created Banque du Maroc, known since 1987 as Bank Al-Maghrib.

== History ==
=== Background ===
Projects for a bank that would stabilize the Moroccan monetary situation and promote trade and development in the Sultanate started being made in the 1880s, with various initiatives promoted by British, French, Tangier Jewish, and German businessmen and diplomats. From 1901 to 1905, the Banque de Paris et des Pays-Bas, simultaneously involved in the sovereign debt restructuring that led in 1904 to the creation of the Moroccan Debt Administration, worked with the French government to create a state bank that would be nominally placed under the authority of the Sultan but practically under full French ownership and control. Even though that project failed following the First Moroccan Crisis of 1905, when the German Empire attempted to prevent France from establishing a protectorate over Morocco, it provided the blueprint for the subsequent creation of the State Bank of Morocco as an international joint venture.

=== Creation ===
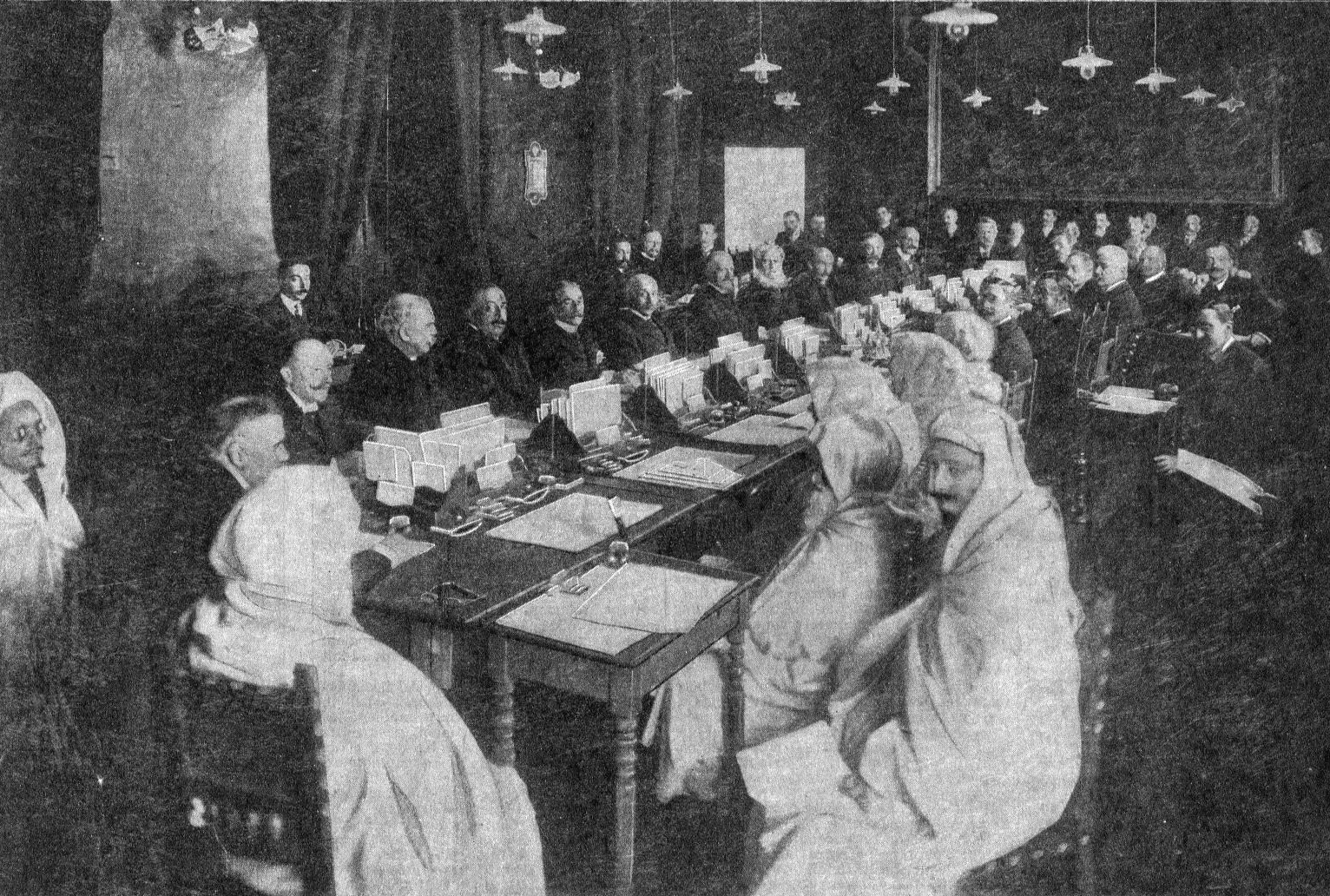
Moroccan and European negotiators at the Algeciras Conference, 1906

The decision to create the State Bank of Morocco was eventually made at the Algeciras Conference, which took place in early 1906 in Algeciras, Spain, with the aim to determine the future status of Morocco, including reform of its administration and finances and ensuring free trade. The participating governments endorsed the project of a state bank and adopted provisions for its establishment. On 7 April 1906, the representatives of eleven European countries and the United States of America joined Morocco in signing the conference's final act ("Act of Algeciras"), whose articles 31 to 58 define the concession of the State Bank. Prodded by both the French and British governments, British financier Ernest Cassel reluctantly provided support for the new venture.

A committee chaired by Bank of France Governor Georges Pallain was tasked with drafting the State Bank's statute and a regulation defining its relation with the Moroccan government. Following ratification of the Act of Algeciras by the participating nations, the bank's constituent general assembly was held at the Bank of France in Paris under Pallain's chairmanship and officially established it on 25 February 1907 as a limited company under French law, with registered office (French: siège social) in Tangier but whose board of directors would meet in Paris. In practice, most board meetings were only attended by three directors, which further reinforced French control over the bank's day-to-day affairs.

The State Bank's capital was initially divided into 14 equal blocks of shares (7.14 percent each). Each of the 12 participating countries (Austria-Hungary, Belgium, France, Germany, Italy, the Netherlands, Portugal, Russia, Spain, Sweden, the United Kingdom, and Morocco itself; the United States did not take part) received one block; the two remaining blocks of shares were reserved for the consortium associated with the Moroccan debt restructuring of 1904, in practice controlled by the Banque de Paris et des Pays-Bas. Each of the European countries, in turn, transferred their shares to a financial institution that would manage them and exercise the voting rights: these were Creditanstalt for Austria-Hungary; Société Générale de Belgique for Belgium; the Banque de Paris et des Pays-Bas for France; Mendelssohn & Co. for Germany; Società Bancaria Italiana for Italy; the Netherlands Trading Society; Banco de Portugal; the Banque du Nord for Russia; Bank of Spain; Skandinaviska Banken for Sweden; and Glyn, Mills, Currie & Co. for the UK. As a consequence, the Banque de Paris et des Pays-Bas controlled a total of 21.4 percent (3/14) of the shares, giving it pre-eminence from the outset.

The State Bank had some of the functions of a central bank and in 1911 started to mint silver coins (Moroccan rials, also known as Hassani), and to issue banknotes. It had the right, for a 40-year term expiring at end-1946, to issue banknotes backed by gold. It had a strict cap on the spending of the Sultanate. The national banks of France, Germany, Spain, and the United Kingdom, which guaranteed the bank's loans, each appointed one of the State Bank's four overseers (French: censeurs).

=== Later development ===
The State Bank's first years were difficult. Initially, the Sultan of Morocco was opposed to its monopoly over Morocco's fiscal functions. Following the loss of Morocco's independence and its partition into a French and a Spanish protectorate in 1912, the Treaty Between France and Spain Regarding Morocco upheld the bank's rights and duties as defined in the 1906 Act of Algeciras, both in the French protectorate and the Spanish protectorate, with only minor changes to its governance. The two countries provided that the State Bank would recruit Spanish staff in the Spanish protectorate and French staff in the French one, without mutual competition.

Under the new protectorate regime, the State Bank of Morocco suffered competition from the Banque de l'Algérie, whose banknotes had become legal tender in Morocco during World War I, together with French ones. By 1919, it was unable to maintain a fixed parity between the Hassani rial and the French franc, and in October of that year, the fixed exchange rate was abandoned. By that time, there was a campaign by pro-Algerian interests and the French Finance Ministry for the money issuance privilege in Morocco to be transferred to the Banque de l'Algérie, thus achieving monetary unification of French North Africa. The French Foreign Ministry, the protectorate authorities and the Banque de Paris et des Pays-Bas pushed back against that project. In March 1920, the State Bank demonetized the Hassani and issued notes and coins denominated in Moroccan franc. An operations account ensured that from December 1921 the Moroccan and French francs would trade at parity. That same month, the Banque de l'Algérie acquired the block of State Bank shares formerly controlled by Germany. Eventually, however, the rivalry became costly for the Banque de l'Algérie. Starting in 1923, its governor Émile Moreau (who would become the State Bank's chairman in 1935) sought a compromise, and in early 1925 an agreement was made between the two institutions that practically sealed the dominance of the State Bank of Morocco (and through it, of the Banque de Paris et des Pays-Bas) over Morocco's monetary system. By mid-1925, the former Austrian and Russian stakes and most of the Moroccan one had also passed under French control, which thus represented slightly over half of the State Bank's total equity capital. The bank's business improved during the rest of the interwar period.

In 1943, after Operation Torch had led to Allied control of Morocco, the State Bank transferred gold to a correspondent bank in Lisbon, in what the U.S. authorities viewed as an act of collaboration with Vichy France orchestrated by the Bank of France in Paris.

In 1946, the State Bank received an extension for 20 years of its currency issuance monopoly. By 1947, the Banque de Paris et des Pays-Bas owned 57.2 percent of the State Bank's capital and could appoint eight of its 14 Board members. The State Bank was highly profitable throughout the 1950s.

In 1958, the newly independent Moroccan government started negotiations with France and the State Bank to reclaim for itself the right to issue money. Decree n° 1.59.233 of 30 June 1959 created the Banque du Maroc. The new central bank took over the issuance of money the next day, and replaced the State Bank of Morocco, while essentially keeping its Moroccan infrastructure and staff. The State Bank of Morocco's residual French operations, including the headquarters building on Quai d'Orsay in Paris and renamed Société internationale de financement et de placements, were merged into its parent the Banque de Paris et des Pays-Bas in 1960.

== Buildings ==
The State Bank had its corporate head office (French: siège social) in Tangier, its "seat of administration" (French: siège administratif) in Paris, and from 1925, its general management (French: direction générale) in Rabat. In Paris, where the State Bank's board of directors met, it was initially established at 3, rue Volney. On 4 December 1922 it moved to 33 rue La Boétie, where the bank also opened a branch office for its French customers and stayed until at least the late 1930s. By 1950, it had relocated to 59 quai d'Orsay, in the former Parisian mansion of aristocrat Robert de Vogüé who had died there in 1936. The latter building was demolished in the early 1970s and replaced by the Embassy of South Africa in Paris.

At its creation in 1907, the State Bank of Morocco took over the Moroccan operations of the Comptoir national d'escompte, including its current accounts and its three branches in Tangier, Casablanca, and Mogador (now Essaouira). In the context of pre-protectorate Morocco, all three were located in the respective cities' medinas. By June 1913, the State Bank's network had expanded with new branches in Mazagan (now El Jadida), Oujda, Rabat, Safi, and Larache in the Spanish protectorate. By December 1921, branches had been added in Fez, Kenitra, Marrakesh, Meknes, and also Alcazarquivir (now Ksar el-Kebir) and Tétouan in the Spanish protectorate. By July 1925, a branch had been added in Settat (which appears to have closed a few years later) as well as offices in Oued Zem and El Ksar. Relations with the Spanish protectorate authorities had been suspended in 1920 but restarted in 1928, allowing the opening of new branches in Arcila (now Asilah) and Villa Sanjurjo (now Al Hoceima). A branch was opened in March 1930 in Beni Ansar, and another one in 1950 in Agadir.

In Tangier, the State Bank's head office was located in its property inherited from the Comptoir national d'escompte, a Moorish-style multistory building constructed in 1903 in the vicinity of the Petit Socco, the old center of the city’s commercial activity. In 1952, the bank moved to a purpose-built late art deco building on Tangier's Boulevard Antée (now Avenue Mohammed V), designed by architect Edmond Brion, with echoes of the bank's Casablanca branch which Brion had completed in 1937. The original headquarters in the Medina later became a commercial venue for the display of Moroccan handicrafts. In 2017, it was renovated and repurposed as a hotel branded Palais Zahia. The 1952 building, now the Tangier branch of Bank Al-Maghrib, was comprehensively renovated in 2020.

In Casablanca, the State Bank soon moved out of its initial branch in the Medina quarter, inherited from the Comptoir national d'escompte as in Tangier. On 30 October 1915, Hubert Lyautey inaugurated a new building on place de France, now United Nations Square. Around 1920, that building was expanded with a Moorish Revival tiled roof. It was demolished in the second half of the 20th century after the creation nearby of the Avenue des Forces Armées Royales, under new urban planning proposed by Michel Écochard. Meanwhile, the branch had moved in 1937 to its iconic location on the northern side of the main square of colonial Casablanca, now Mohammed V Square. The new building's initial design was by architects Auguste Cadet and Edmond Brion, before their collaboration ended in 1935; it was completed by Brion alone, in a characteristic mix of art deco and Moorish Revival architecture. The inauguration ceremony on 16 October 1937 featured speeches by Resident-general Charles Noguès and by the State Bank's CEO Georges Desoubry. Sultan Mohammed V also visited it on 22 August 1938. That building is now the local branch of Bank Al-Maghrib.

In Rabat, the State Bank purchased land in September 1921 for a building that would be representative of the city's enhanced status as Morocco's new capital. The state-of-the-art building, designed by Auguste Cadet and Edmond Brion and in which central administrative functions were transferred from Tangier, was inaugurated on 15 December 1925 and was described as "the most beautiful modern monument of French Morocco". It is now the central headquarters of Bank Al-Maghrib.

Aside from Rabat and Casablanca, Cadet and Brion worked jointly in the 1920s and early 1930s on the design of the State Bank's branches in Marrakesh (1922), Mazagan (1925), and Oujda (1926, replacing an earlier three-story, medieval-looking building). After his collaboration with Cadet ended in 1935, Brion designed the State Bank's new branch in Agadir (1951–52) as well as its new headquarters in Tangier. The Agadir branch was repurposed as a museum in 2022. The branches in Fez and Meknes were designed in the early 1920s by architect René Canu. A new building for the Tétouan branch, designed by architect José de Larrucea Garma, was inaugurated in 1930.

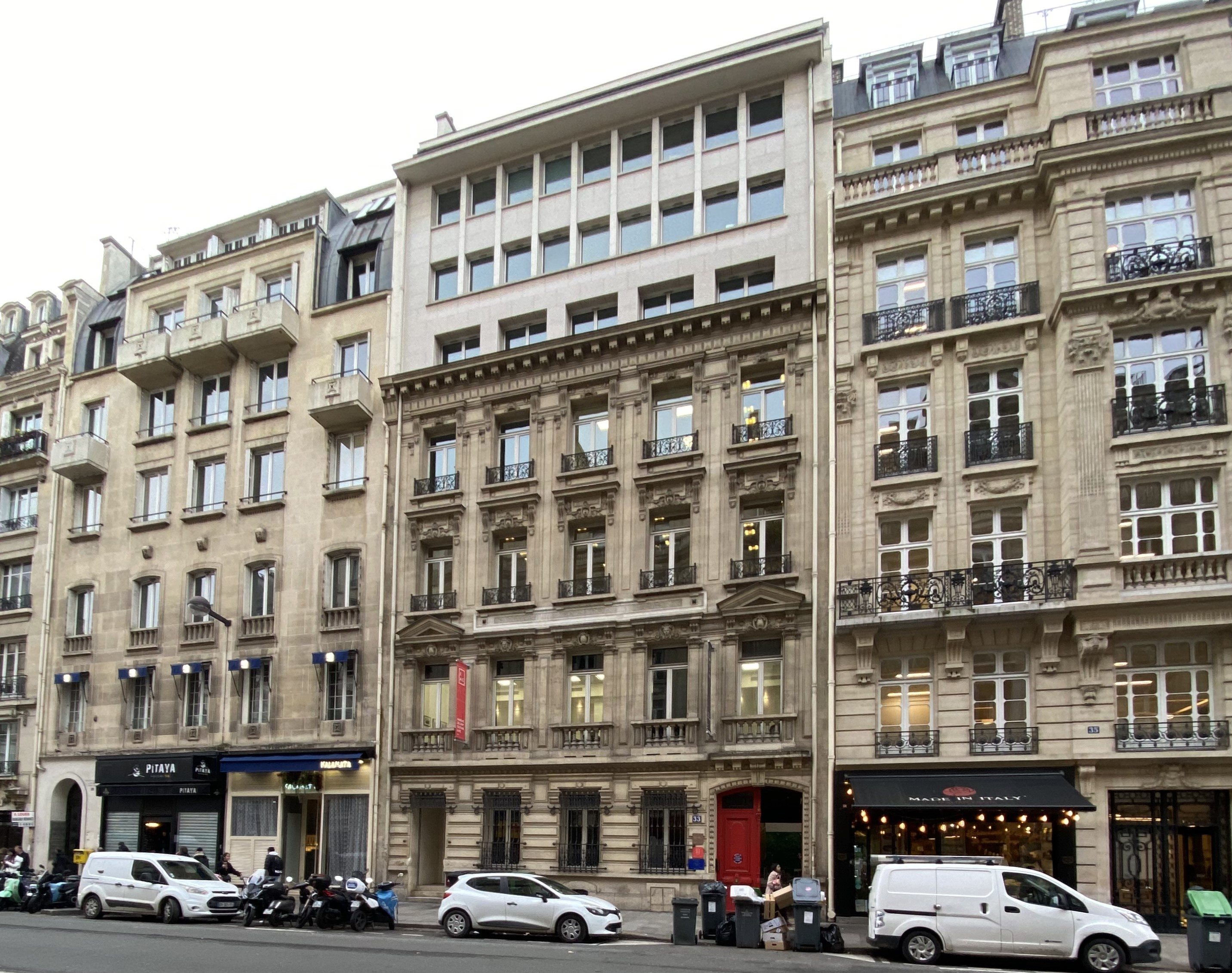
Building at 33, rue La Boétie (center), the bank's Paris headquarters from 1922 to World War II

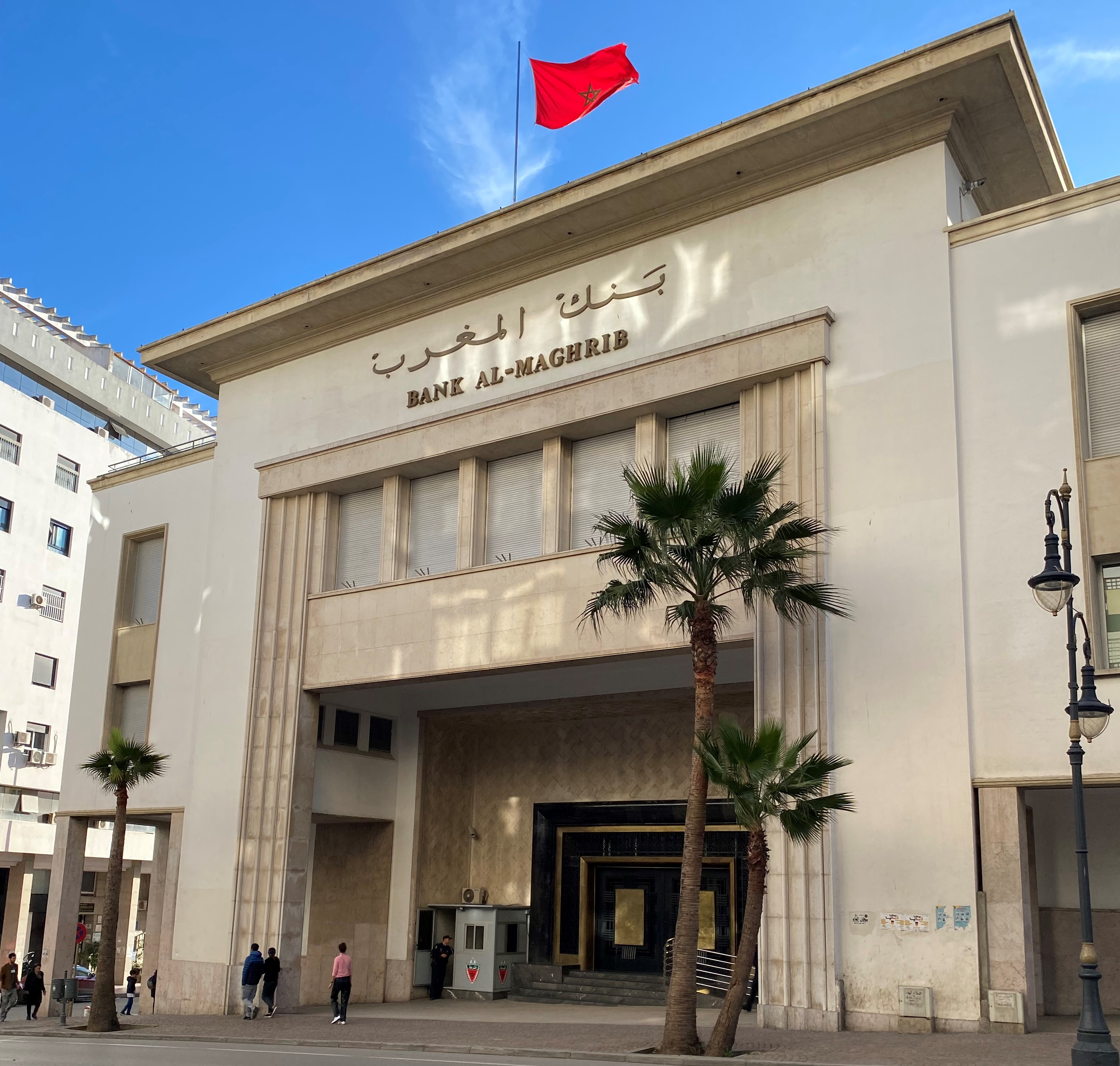
New Tangier building inaugurated in 1952

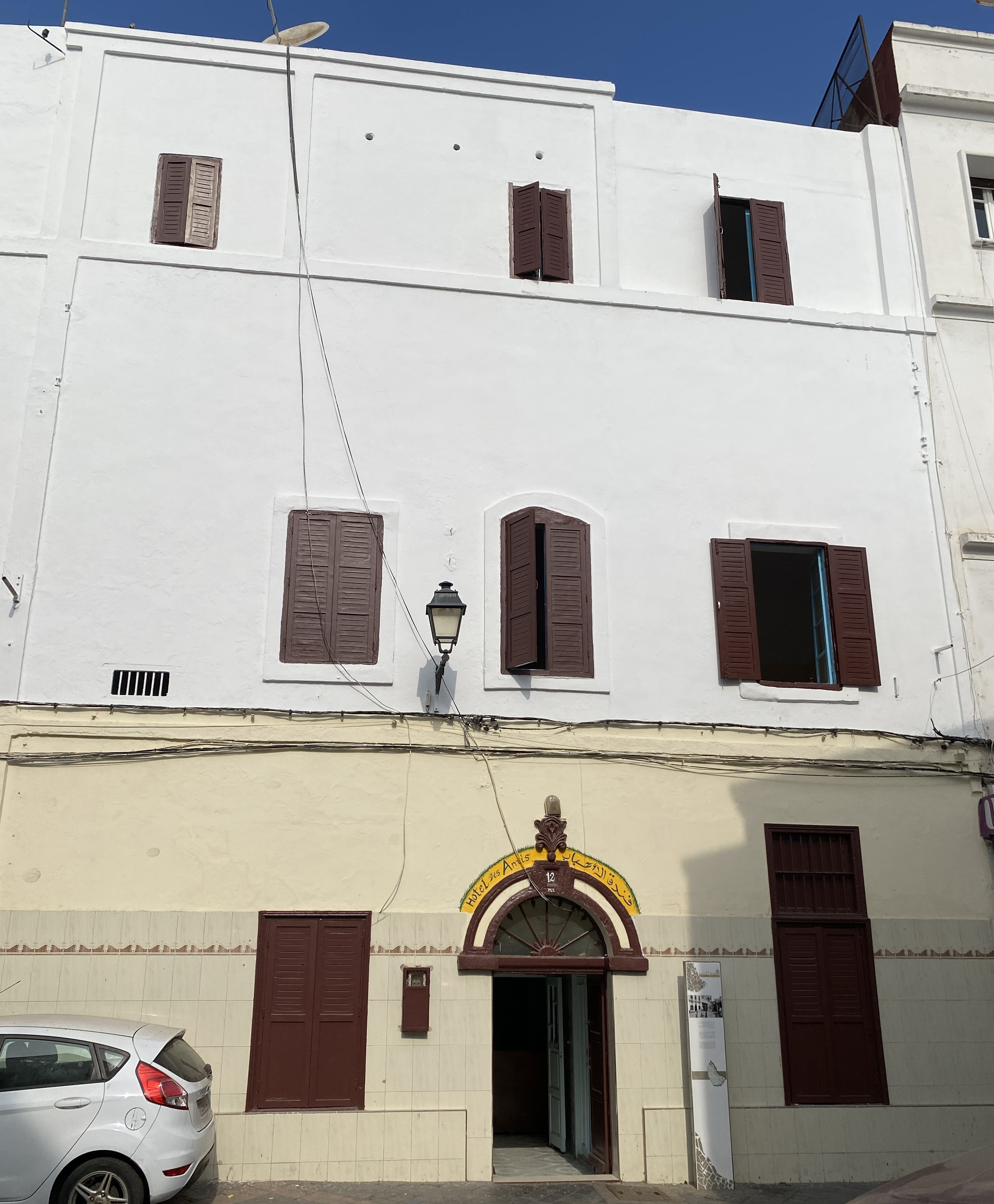
Former branch (1907-1915) in the medina of Casablanca

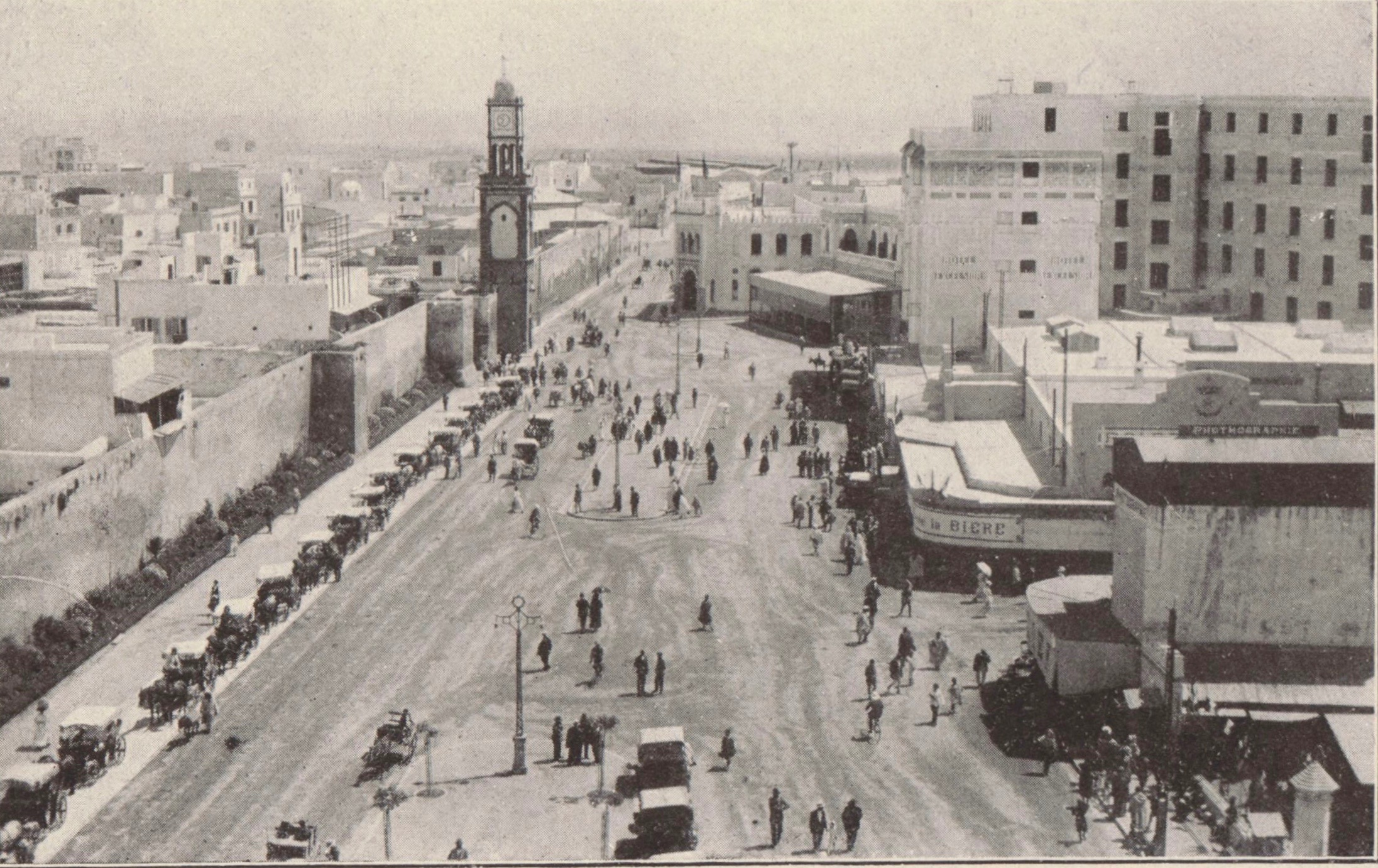
1917 view of place de France, with the State Bank's branch inaugurated in 1915 (center), across the boulevard du 4e Zouaves (now boulevard Houphouët-Boigny) from the clock tower

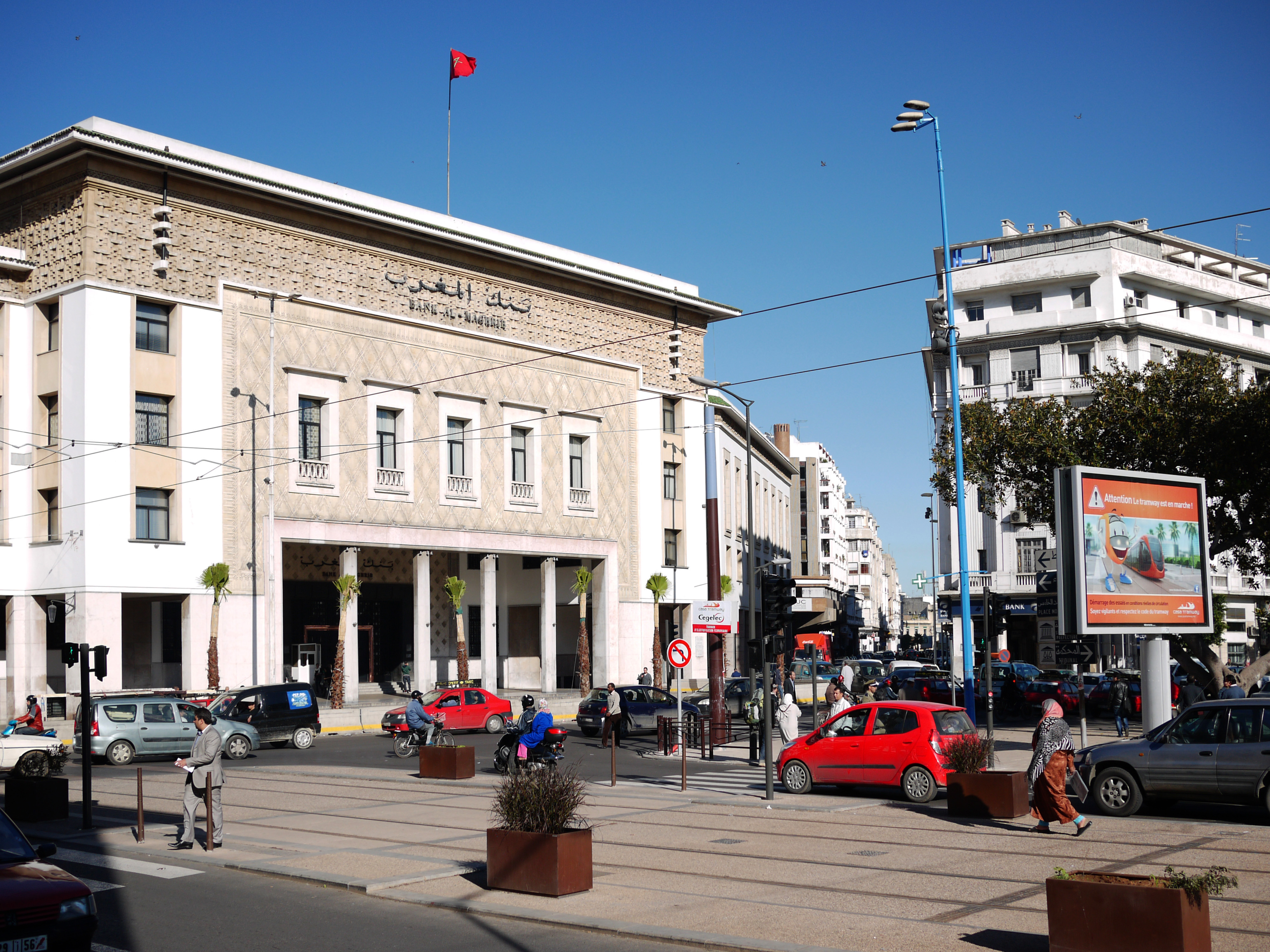
Casablanca branch building on Mohammed V Square, inaugurated 1937

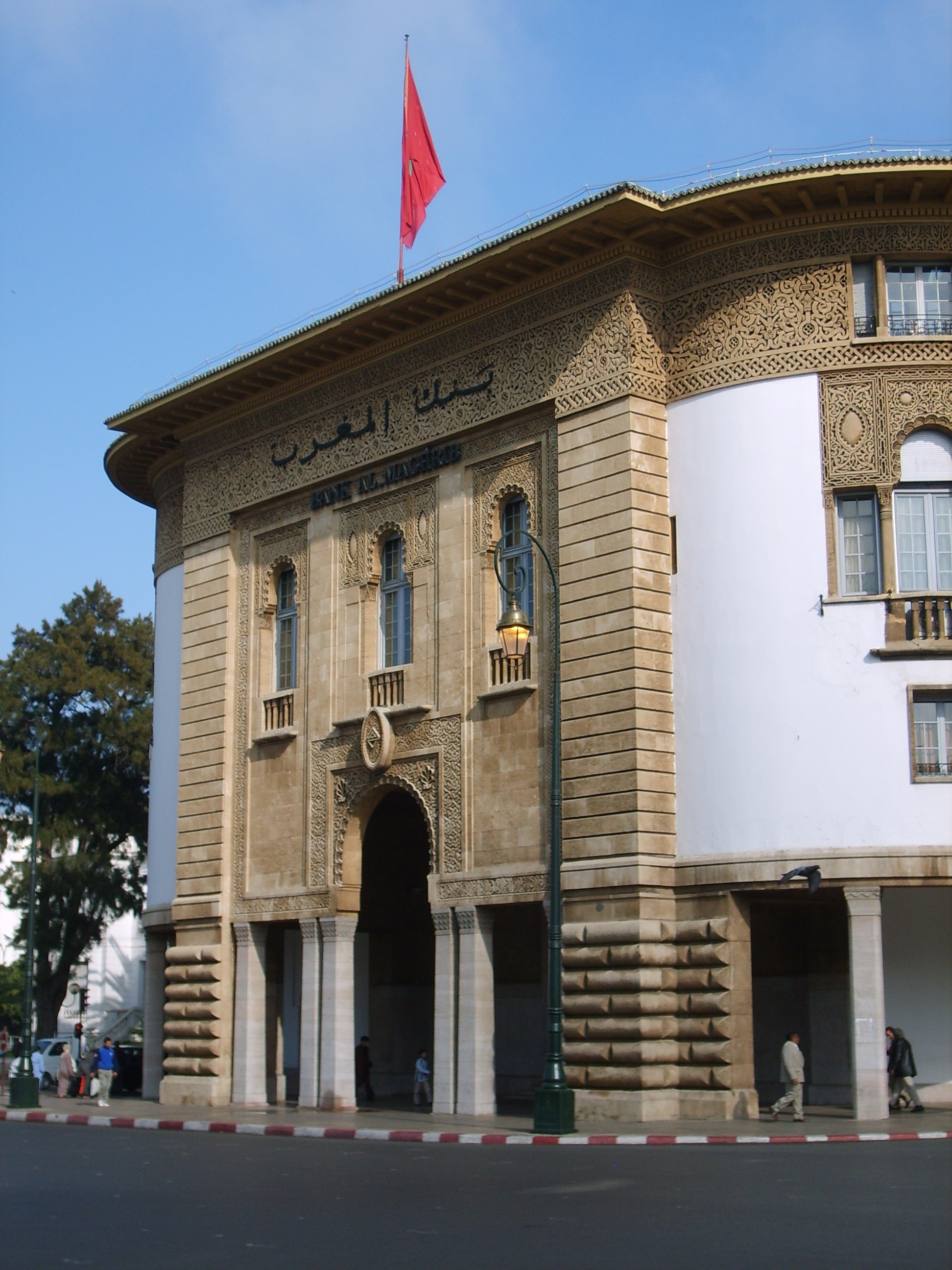
Main façade of the Rabat building on Avenue Mohammed V, inaugurated 1925

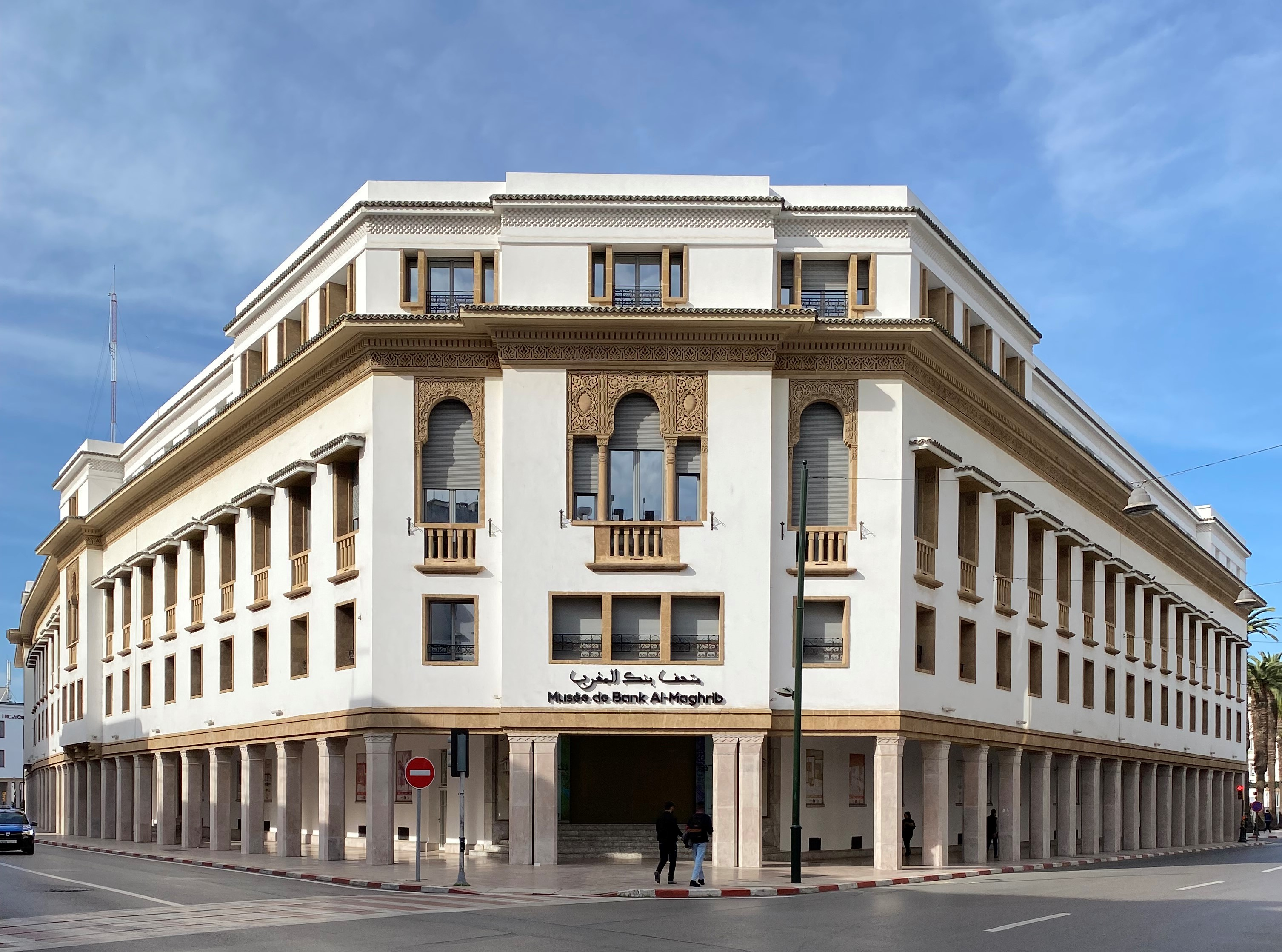
Rear view of the Rabat building, now entrance of the Bank al-Maghrib Museum

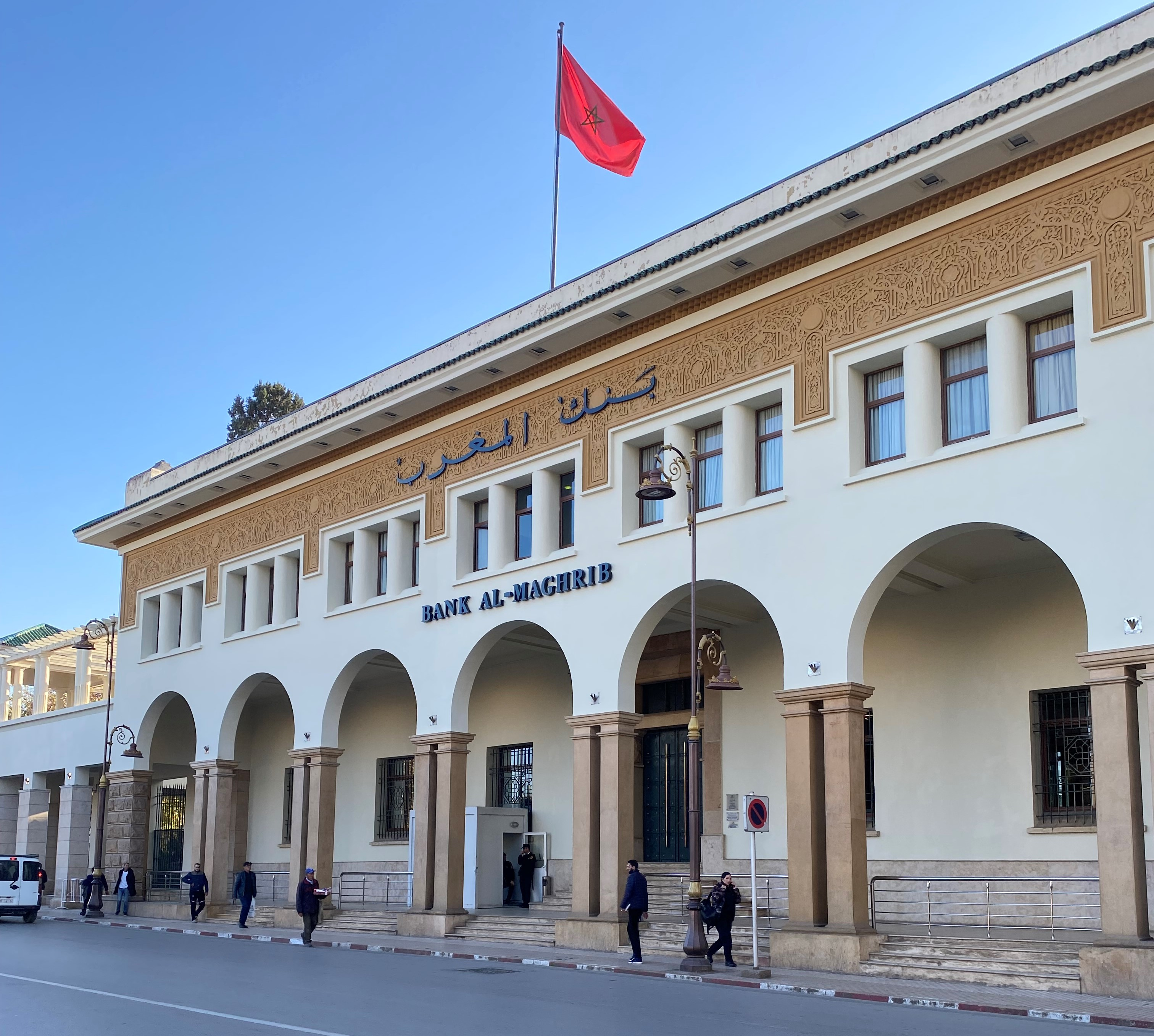
Branch in Fez, early 1920s

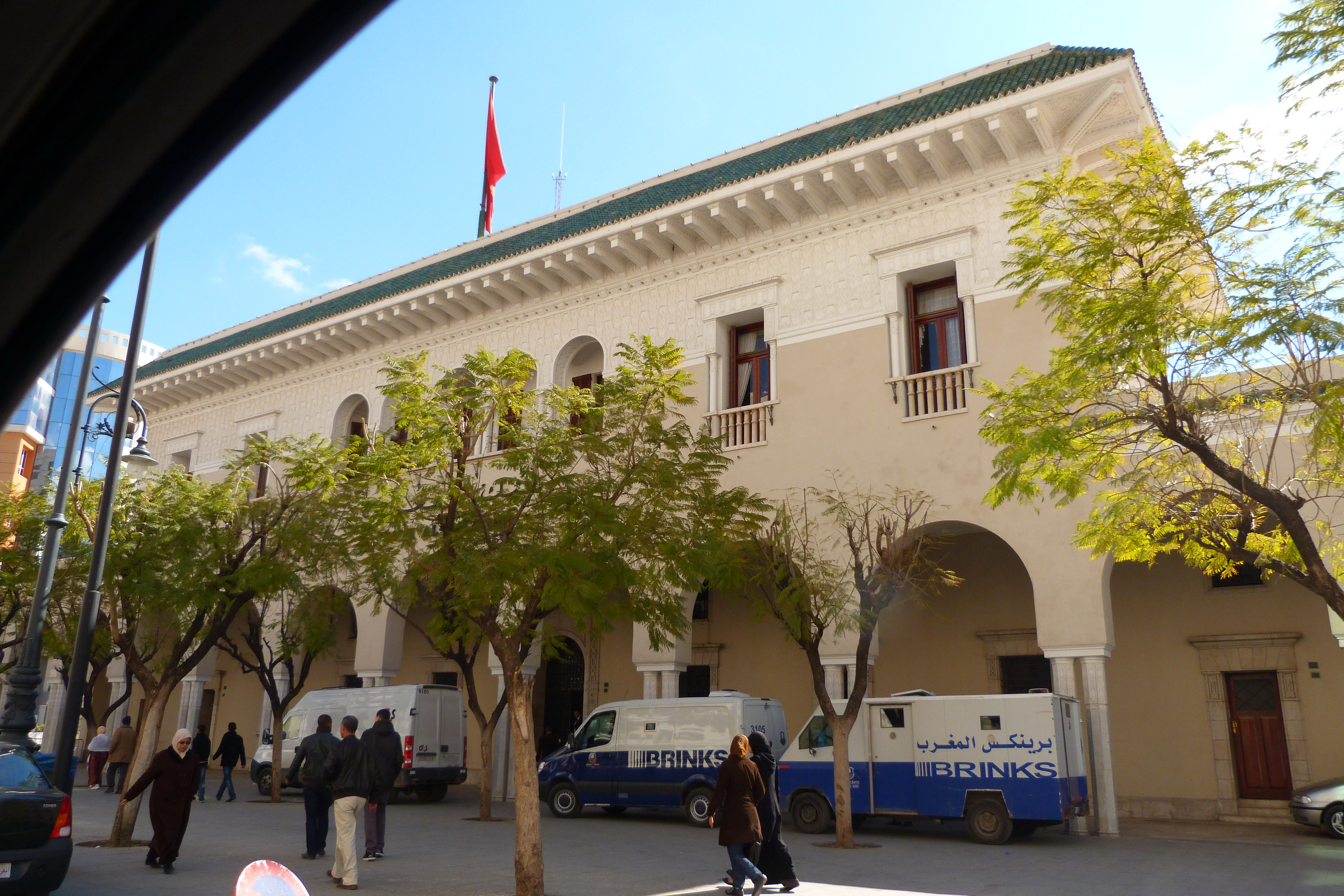
Branch in Oujda, 1926

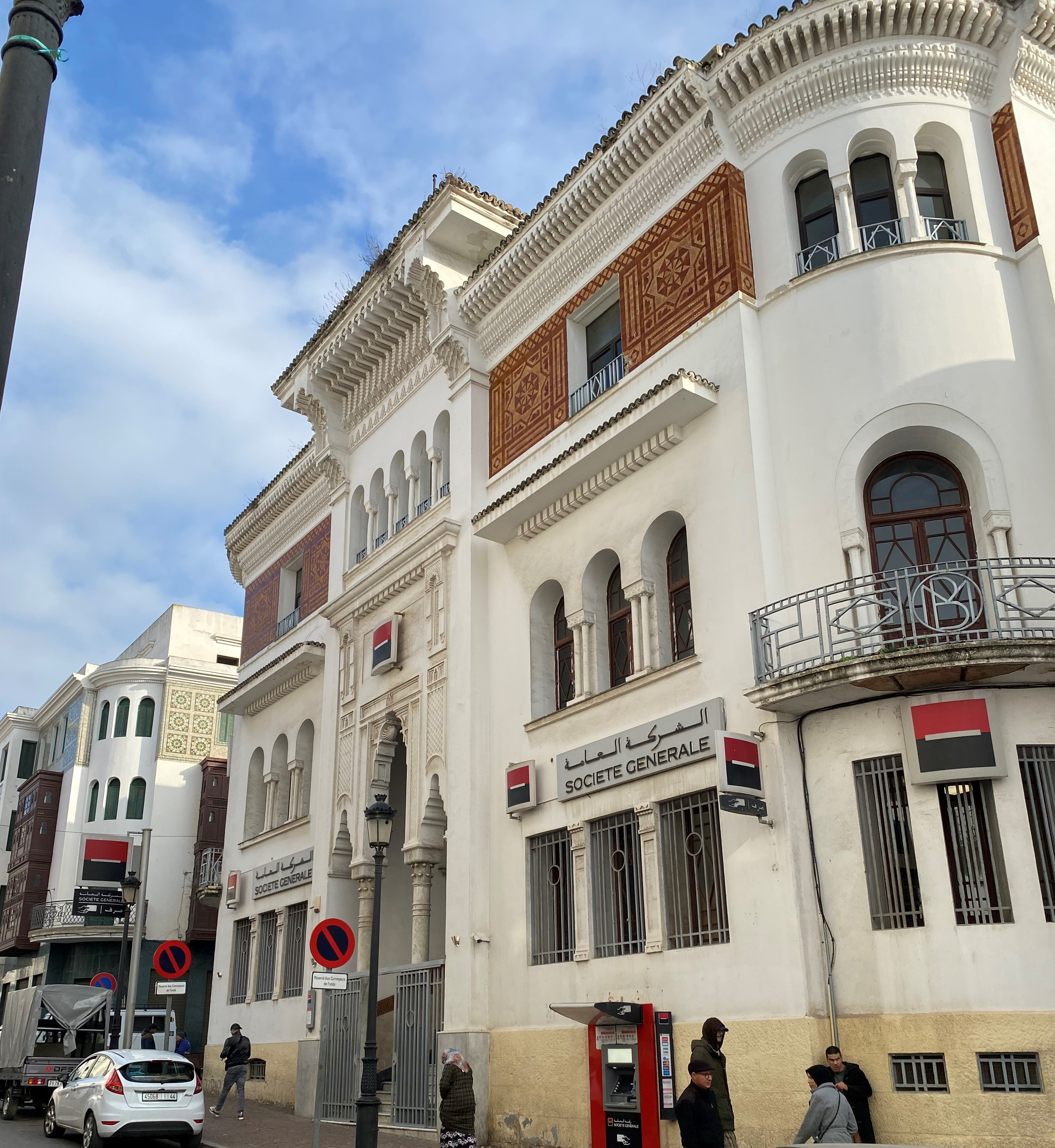
Branch in Tetouan, 1930

== Leadership ==
The State Bank of Morocco's key officers were the chairman of the board (French: président du conseil) and chief executive (French: directeur général). Throughout the bank's existence, both positions were effectively selected by and from the Banque de Paris et des Pays-Bas, of which the State Bank's chairman was typically a vice chairman of the board.

=== Chairmen of the board ===
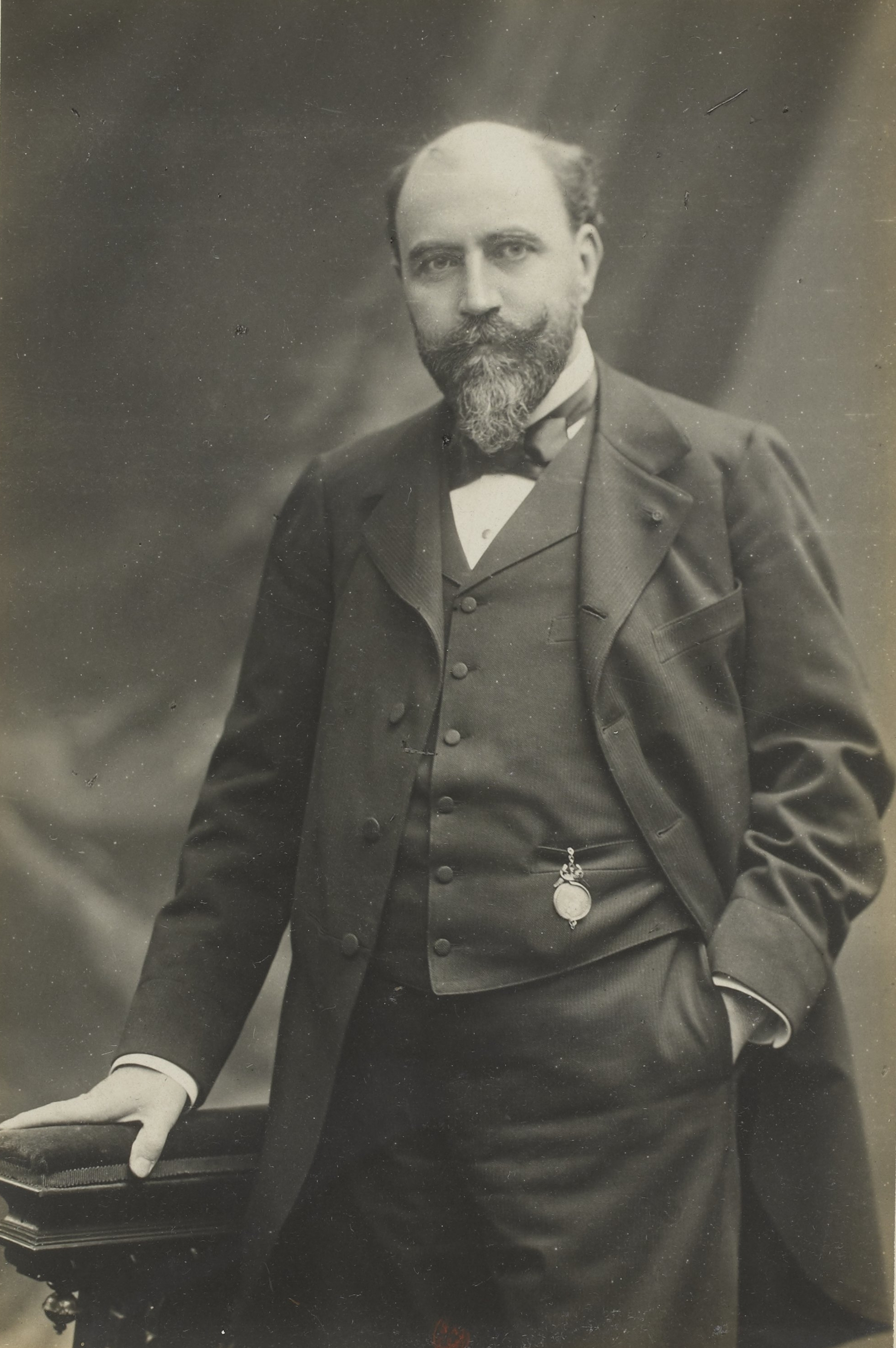
Stéphane Dervillé, the State Bank of Morocco’s third and longest-standing chairman

- Léopold Renouard (25 February 1907-9 March 1909)
- Charles Demachy (19 March 1909-15 May 1912)
- Stéphane Dervillé (18 May 1912-4 October 1925)
- Jules Cambon (28 October 1925?-19 September 1935)
- Émile Moreau (1935-1945?)
- Émile Oudot (1945-1955)
- Henri Deroy (1955-1959)

Among the other board members, Marcus Wallenberg Sr. represented Sweden from the State Bank's creation until 1940, when he was succeeded by his son Marcus Wallenberg Jr. who remained on the board until the 1950s.

=== Chief executives ===
- Georges-Hippolyte Gauran (1907-May 1921 in Tangier, and until the 1930s in Paris as co-CEO)
- Paul Rengnet (May 1921-March 1927)
- Georges Desoubry (March 1927 – 1942?)
- Jean Bapst (1942?-1945?)
- Edmond Spitzer (1945-1957)
- François Bizard (1957-1959)

== Influence ==
The State Bank of Morocco served as a model for the National Bank of Albania, established on 2 September 1925. The National Bank had its Albanian seat in Durrës, later moved to the new capital of Tirana, but was created under Italian law and its board met in Rome.

== See also ==
- Moroccan franc
- Ottoman Bank
- National Bank of Haiti
- Moroccan Debt Administration
- Tangier International Zone
- List of banks in France
- List of banks in Morocco
