= Decree of Muharram =

A Decree of Muharram or Firman of Muharram is any of a number of decrees or firmans issued by the Ottoman Empire in the Islamic month of Muharram. The most important of which, both issued by ‘Abdu’l-Hamid II during the decline of the Ottoman Empire, are:

- Firman issued in Muharram 1299 AH (December 1881 CE) which turned over a large proportion of the Ottoman Empire's revenue to the Public Debt Administration for the repayment of foreign creditors, practically bankrupting the Ottomans after the Russo-Turkish War, 1877-1878.
- Firman issued on 5 Muharram 1311 AH (18 July 1893 CE) which regarded the appointment of a Chief Rabbi of Jerusalem and the rights of the Jewish community in that province.

Additionally, Decree of Muharram may refer to the Islamic tradition that it is unlawful (haraam) to go to war in the month of Muharram.
