= Caisse de la Dette Publique =

International committee to supervise repayment of Suez Canal loans

The Caisse de la Dette Publique ("Public Debt Commission", Arabic: صندوق الدين في مصر, romanized: ṣundūq ad-dayn fī-Miṣr) was an international commission established by a decree issued by Khedive Isma'il of Egypt on 2 May 1876 to supervise the payment by the Egyptian government of the loans to the European governments following several modernisation projects including the construction of the Suez Canal. The Khedive had defaulted on paying back Egypt's foreign debts, which were mostly owed to the British and the French. These governments in turn joined to impose a system of supervision over Egypt's debts. The goal of the commission was to investigate everything regarding Egypt's foreign debts: what Egypt could afford to pay, in what way the taxes were collected, how high the amount of floating debt was, and how that debt had been incurred.

== Historic debt accumulation ==
During the late 19th century, Egypt undertook several modernization projects for which they required loans from other states. The main sources of the major debt accumulation of Egypt, for which the debt commission was instigated, were the construction of railways, telegraph lines, irrigation systems and the construction of the Suez Canal. Under Isma'il Pasha's rule several railways were constructed: The Cairo-Aswan railway, Cairo-Alexandria line and the Cairo-Suez line. For the construction of these railways Egypt took out a loan worth £3.000.000, in 1866 from the Anglo-Egyptian bank. To purchase estates and develop sugar refineries, a loan of £3,387,000 was taken out 190. Half of this loan went towards the purchasing of estates and the other half went to the development of sugar refineries. Another loan contributing to estate purchasing and the development of sugar refineries was taken out in 1867, worth £2,080,000. Further loans were received in 1886, 1870 and 1873 totalling £19,033,000.

In eleven years time Egypt accumulated an estimated debt of £68,000,000. Egypt's floating debt increased as well totalling £20,000,000. The floating debt and nominal debt combined accounted for £94,000,000 which Egypt owed to several states including Great Britain and France, amongst others. This major debt caused an additional debt for the Egyptian people with regard to interest that needed to be paid back under the supervision of the public debt commission, this extra debt was estimated around £300,000,000.

=== Suez Canal ===
In 1875 Isma'il Pasha decided to sell Egypt's shares in the Suez Canal to make up for its foreign debt. The shares were bought by Rothschild & Co on the instruction of the British prime minister Benjamin Disraeli. The sale achieved a price of £4,075,996.13.7.

== The system of the commission ==
"This system was mainly under the control of two countries, France and Britain. This system of 'dual control' represented Europeans' direct intervention in Egypt's financial affairs." It was initially led by a secretary and three commissioners representing the governments of Austria-Hungary, France and Italy; from 1877 the United Kingdom and from 1885 Russia and Germany. One of the commissioners would serve as the president, or chairman, of the commission.

The key functions and responsibilities of the Caisse de la Dette Publique were debt management, debt consolidation and debt restructuring. Debt management was primarily concerned with collecting debt payments and ensuring that the repayments were done on time. Debt consolidation reorganised the organisation of the scattered debts, its task was to create a unified overview of all outstanding repayments. Debt restructuring entailed negotiating agreements with the creditors involved, these agreements aimed to adjust the terms of debt payments to alleviate financial pressures.

George Goschen, a Director of the Bank of England and later on a Chancellor of the Exchequer, and Edmond Joubert, a French banker from Paris, were chosen to coordinate the initial task of creating a plan for the Egyptian financial situation.

The 'Dual Control' over Egypt by France and Britain ended in 1882, when Britain occupied Egypt alone after the British Army crushed the Egyptian nationalist uprising.

== The Caisse de la Dette Publique and the Ottoman Public Debt Administrations ==
During the 1870s, Egypt was still nominally under the suzerainty of the Ottoman Empire. The Caisse de la Dette Publique in Egypt was comparable to the Ottoman Public Debt Administration (OPDA), which was also administered by European powers and was established around the same time as the Public Debt Commission. The OPDA managed to reduce Ottoman debt by 58 percent, whilst Egypt's total debt burden was only brought back by 2 percent.

== Abolition ==
The Public Debt Commission was abolished by a bilateral agreement between the British and the Egyptian governments, signed on 17 July 1940, due to Allied interest in improving relations with Cairo during the Second World War.

== See also ==
- International Financial Commission in the Kingdom of Greece
- Moroccan Debt Administration
