= Moroccan franc =

Former French Moroccan and Moroccan currency

The franc (Arabic: فرنك) was the currency of French Morocco from 1921. It became the currency of all Morocco in 1957 and circulated until 1974. It was divided into 100 centimes (Arabic: سنتيم).

== History ==
Before the first World War, the Moroccan rial was worth 5 French francs. However, after the war, the franc's value fell, such that when the franc replaced the rial, it was at a rate of 10 francs = 1 rial. The Moroccan franc was equal in value to the French franc. When Spanish Morocco was united with the rest of Morocco, the franc replaced the Spanish peseta at a rate of 1 peseta = 10 francs.

In 1960, the dirham was introduced. It was subdivided into 100 francs. The franc was replaced as the subdivision of the dirham by the centime in 1974.

== Coins ==
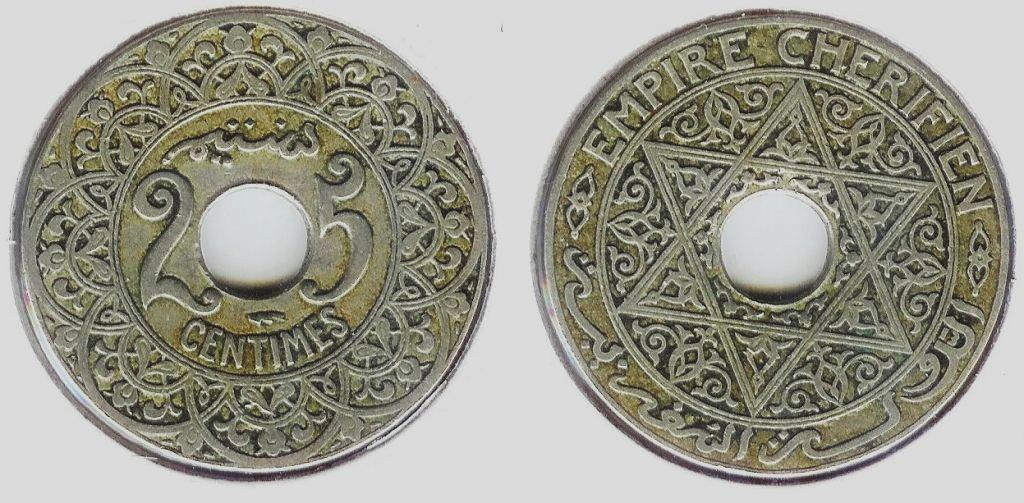
A 1924 Moroccan 25 centimes, with Thunderbolt privy mark.

In 1921, coins were introduced under the reign of Yusuf, in denominations of 25 and 50 centimes and 1 franc. The 25 centimes is a holed, cupro-nickel coin, and comes with three Privy mark varieties: no privy mark, minted in 1921 at Paris, thunderbolt privy mark minted in 1924 at Poissy, and thunderbolt and torch privy marks minted in 1924 at Poissy. The 50 centimes and franc were both minted in 1921 in Paris, and in 1924 at Poissy with the thunderbolt privy mark.

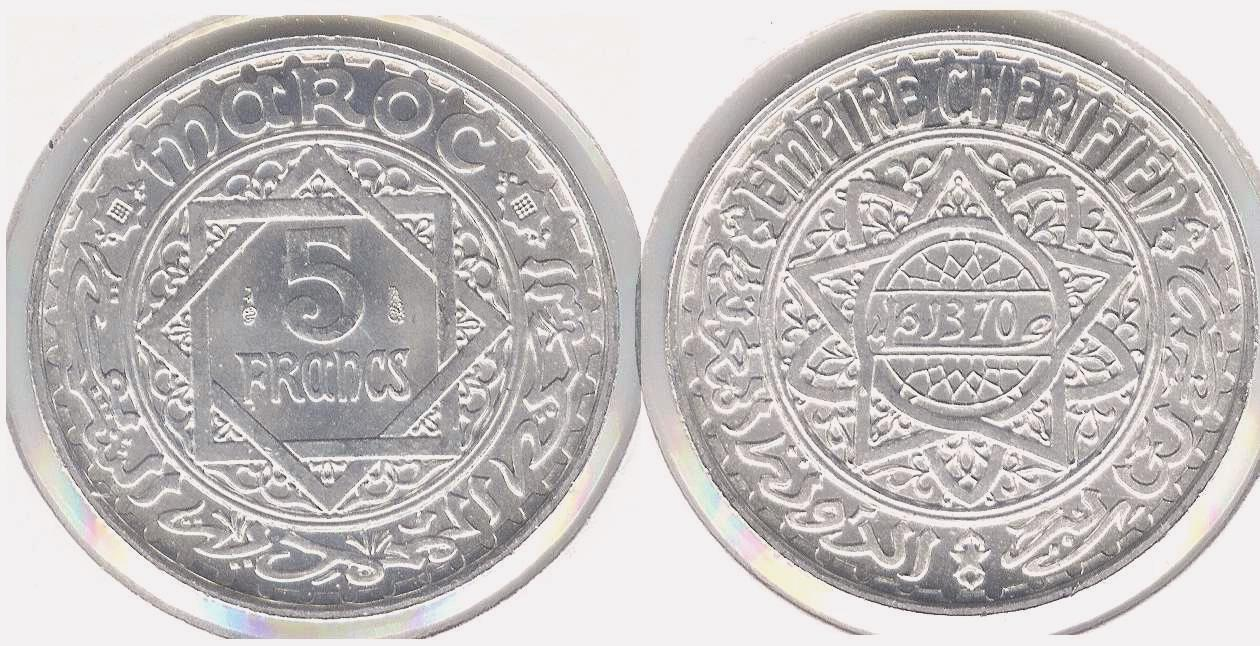
An AH1370 Moroccan 5 francs in Gem Uncirculated.

In 1928, under the reign of Mohammed V, silver 5, 10 and 20 francs coins were introduced. These coins, and all following coins, were minted in Paris. Between 1945 and 1947, aluminum-bronze 50 centimes, 1, 2 and 5 francs and cupro-nickel 10 and 20 francs coins were issued. Another new coinage followed between 1951 and 1953 in denominations of 1, 2 and 5 francs in aluminum, 10, 20 and 50 francs in aluminum-bronze, and silver 100 and 200 francs. Silver 500 francs coins were issued in 1956. The 1951 and 1952 dated 1, 2, 5, 10, 20 and 50 francs coins were minted without a change of date until 1974, when they were replaced by the santim.

All of the coins are easily identified as coinage of the French Moroccan period by the presence of either the legend “Empire Cherifien” or the legend “Maroc.” All of the coins will have one or the other legend, and often both. All of the coins will also have either a pentagram or hexagram form of the Seal of Solomon featured prominently in the devices, and sometimes both.

== Banknotes ==
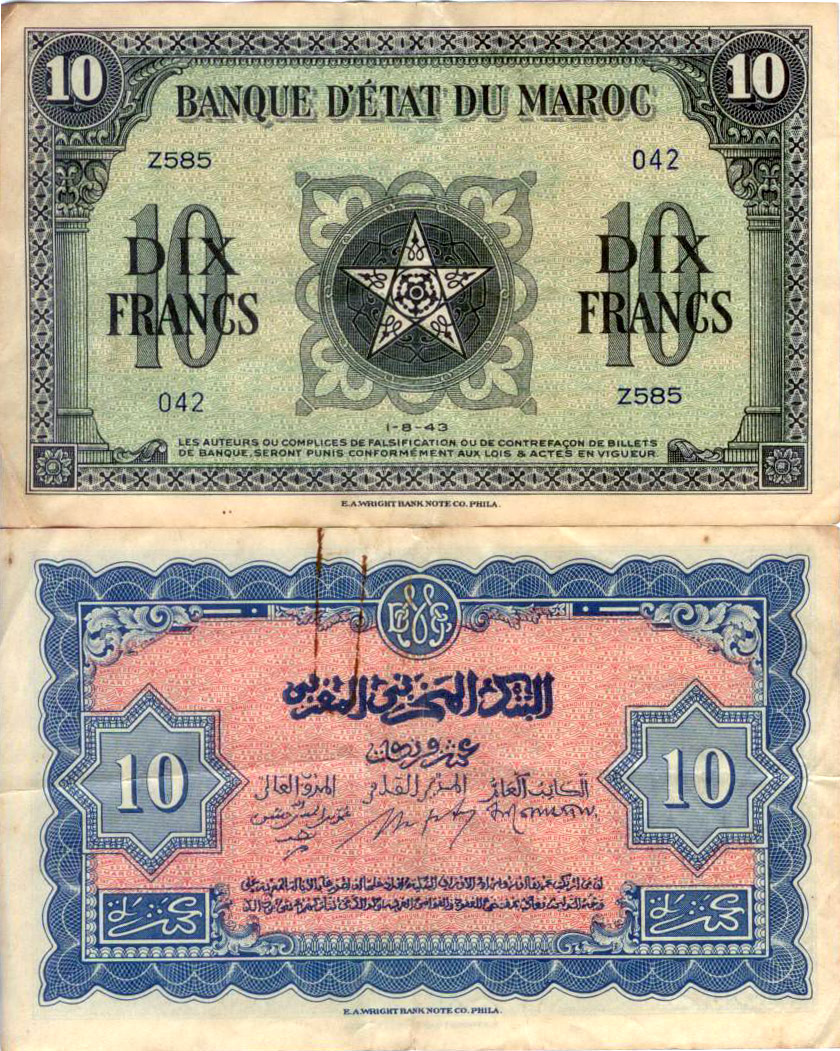
A 1943 Moroccan 10 franc note.

The first Moroccan notes denominated in francs were issued between 1910 and 1917 and were also denominated in rial. Denominations were for 20 francs (4 rial) and 100 francs (20 rial). Although the franc only replaced the rial in 1921, notes were issued in francs from 1919. Emergency issues were made that year in denominations of 25 and 50 centimes, 1 and 2 francs.

Regular issues from the State Bank of Morocco were introduced between 1919 and 1923 in denominations of 5, 10, 20, 50, 100, 500 and 1000 francs. 5000 francs notes appeared in 1938. Further emergency issues were made in 1944 for 50 centimes, 1 and 2 francs. After World War II, a final issue by the State Bank was introduced between 1949 and 1953 in denominations of 50, 100, 500, 1000, 5000 and 10,000 francs.
