= Ottoman public debt =

Loans owed by the Ottoman Empire

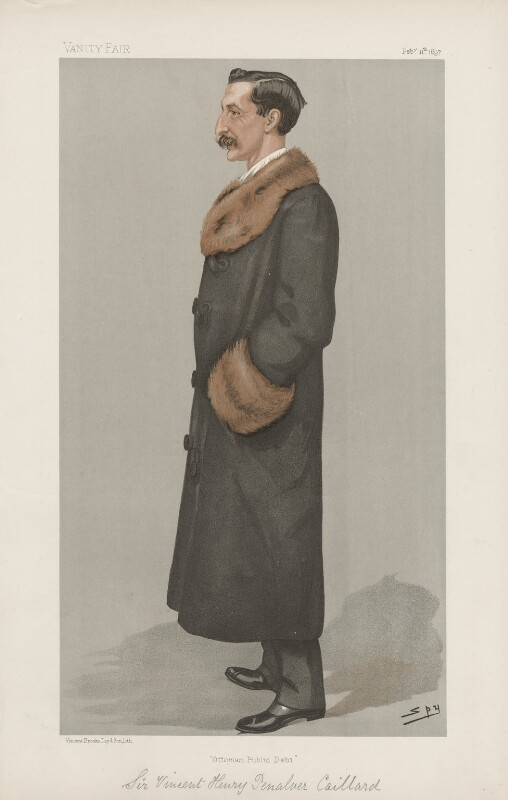
Caricature of Sir Vincent Henry Penalver Caillard (1856-1930). Caption read "Ottoman Public Debt".

The Ottoman public debt was a term which dated back to 24 August 1855, when the Ottoman Empire first entered into loan contracts with its European creditors shortly after the beginning of the Crimean War.

The Empire entered into subsequent loans, partly to finance railway construction and partly to finance deficits between revenues and the lavish expenditure of the Imperial court. Some financial commentators have noted that the terms of these loans were exceptionally favourable to the French and British banks which facilitated them, whereas others have noted that the terms reflected the imperial administration's willingness to constantly refinance its debts.

The Ottoman government declared a sovereign default on its loan repayments with the Ramazan Kararnamesi (Decree of Ramadan) on 30 October 1875. Six years later, as part of the Muharrem Kararnamesi (Decree of Muharrem) on 15 October 1881, which reduced the overall public debt, the Ottoman Public Debt Administration (OPDA) was established. This made the European creditors bondholders, and assigned special rights to the OPDA for collecting various tax and customs revenues within the Ottoman Empire.

After the taking of its first loans, the Empire had taken further loans out in 1858, 1860, 1862, 1863, 1865, and every year between 1869 and 1874. But economic trouble loomed. The Panic of 1873 depressed the economy, and poor harvests followed. Palace intrigues diverted political attention from the debt crisis. Finally, on October 6, 1875, the Empire suspended interest payments on its loans. The amount defaulted on was estimated at 214.5 million British Pounds (equivalent to £2.65×10^{10} in 2024). But the entire income of the Empire had been a mere 21.7 million British pounds (equivalent to £2.68×10^{9} in 2024). The default on the Ottoman debt was met by outrage in European nations, to whom the debts were owed. The concerted efforts of the United Kingdom and France, whose citizens were the chief bondholders on the Ottoman debt, would lead to the creation of the Ottoman Public Debt Administration in 1881.

The Ottoman Public Debt Administration functioned independently of the Ottoman bureaucracy and overseen by Germany, Italy, Austria, the Netherlands, as well as internal Ottoman bondholders. The goal of this arm's length institution was to secure tax revenue from the Ottoman Empire and send it abroad to its citizen bondholders. The Ottoman debt would prove to be a heavy weight on the empire and only added to the other crises that emerged in the 1870s.

== Size ==
The actual size and scale of the Ottoman debt was difficult to calculate in the 19th century, and European creditors found themselves at a knowledge deficit.

Ottoman Empire

- In 1875, it was estimated that the Ottomans owed 214.5 million British Pounds (equivalent to £2.65×10^{10} in 2024). But the entire income of the Empire had been a mere 21.7 million British pounds (equivalent to £2.68×10^{9} in 2024).
- In December 1881, the debt was reduced from £191,000,000 to £106,000,000 with the government's concessions to the OPDA.
- In 1909 it was reported that 90% of the debt was paid.

Republic of Turkey

- At the Paris Conference of 1925, the Republic of Turkey agreed to pay 62% of the Ottoman Empire's pre-1912 debt, and 77% of the Ottoman Empire's post-1912 debt.
- Under the Paris Treaty of 1933, Turkey decreased this amount in its favour and agreed to pay 84.6 million liras out of the remaining total of 161.3 million liras of Ottoman debt.
- The last payment of the Ottoman debt was made by Turkey on 25 May 1954.

== See also ==
- Ottoman Public Debt Administration
- Great Eastern Crisis
