= Falus =

Former currency of Morocco

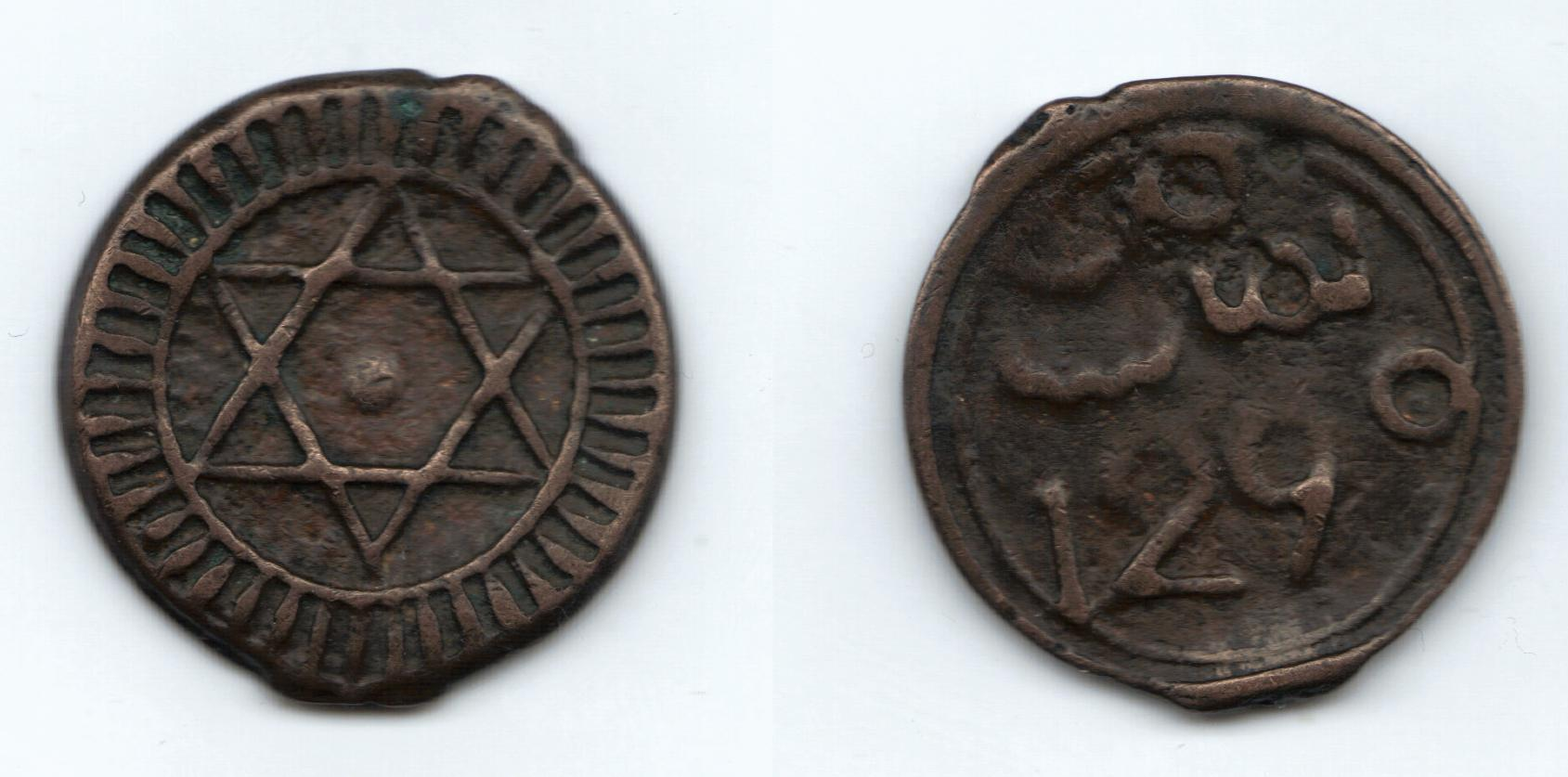
A 4 falus coin of 1873, with the diameter of 28mm, minted at Fes by Mohammed IV (1802–1873) Sultan of Morocco

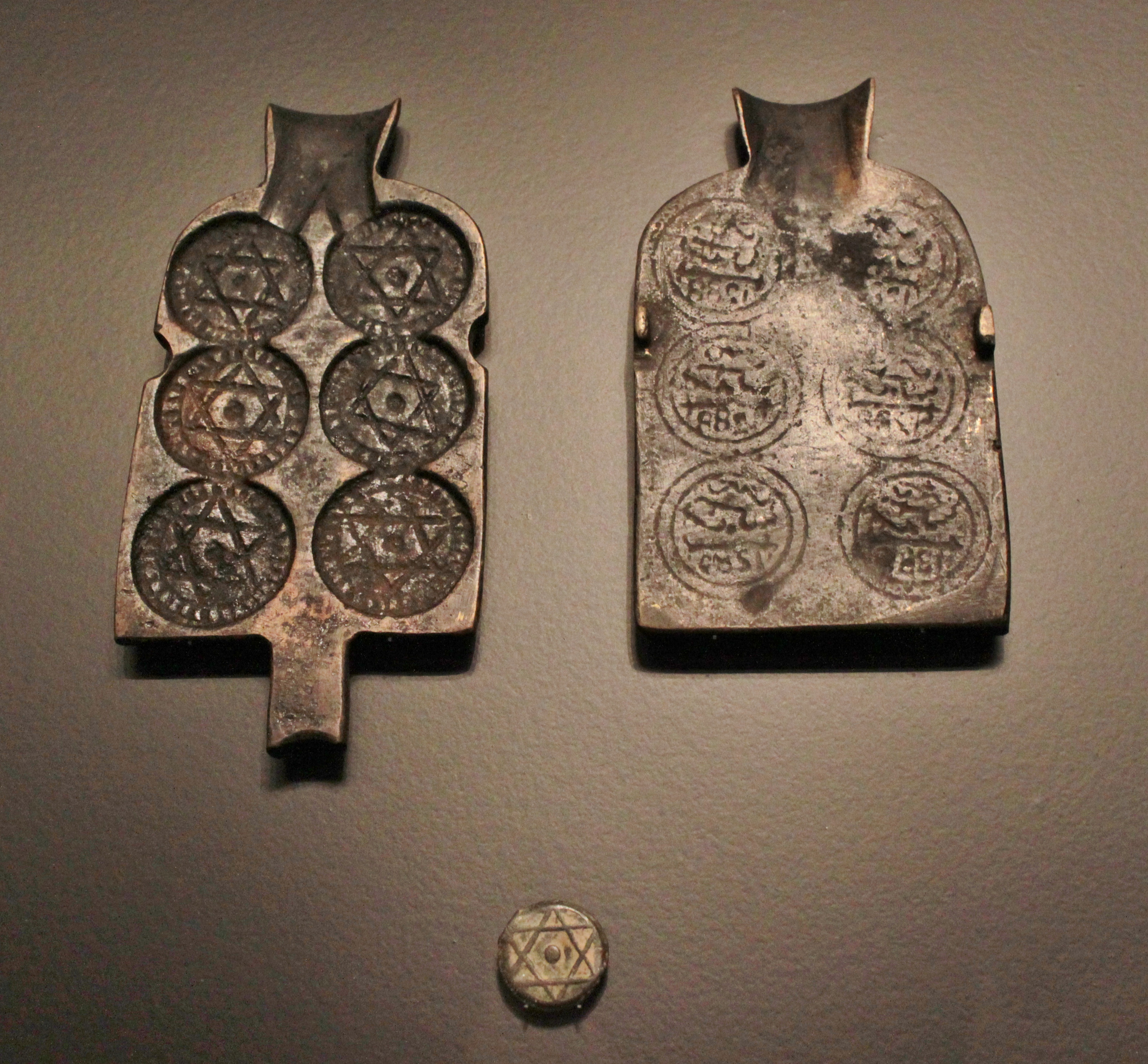
Mold for Faluses (c. 1871) at the Prehistory Museum of Valencia

The falus was a bronze/copper currency of Morocco.

Minted between 1672–1901, denominations of 1/4, 1/2, 1, 2, 3, 4, 6 and 8 falus are recorded in the Standard Catalogue.

== Identification ==
They are typically denominated by size rather than by inscription, and can be difficult to identify precisely.

== Depreciation ==
From 1862, the falus was allowed to float, while the exchange rate for the silver dirham was fixed: this resulted in currency speculation and depreciation, with effectively two parallel currencies.

== See also ==
- Fils (currency)
