= Coat of arms of Morocco =

Versions
- Armiger: Mohammed VI, King of Morocco
- Adopted: 1957
- Crest: Or, the Royal Crown of Morocco, embellished with pearls alternately Gules and Vert
- Shield: Gules, in chief a demi-sun setting, with 15 rays or on a background azure, supported by a fess in bar enarched vert, fusily or and argent; the whole surcharged by an interlaced pentalpha vert on a background gules.
- Supporters: Two Atlas lions proper, the one in dexter in profile and in sinister affronté
- Motto: Arabic: إِنْ تَنْصُرُوا اللهَ يَنْصُرُكُمْ (ʾIn tanṣurūw Allāha yanṣurukum, "If you support God, He will support you")

The coat of arms of Morocco is the arms of dominion of the King of Morocco. It was introduced on 14 August 1957.

== Official description ==
The government of Morocco describes the coat of arms as follows:

Gules, in chief a demi-sun setting, with 15 rays or on a background azure; supported by a fess in bar enarched vert, fusily or and argent; the whole surcharged by a mullet (pentalpha) vert. The shield ensigned by the Royal Crown of Morocco or, embellished with pearls alternately gules and vert; it is bordered with lamrequins or, sustained on 2 cornucopias and supported by two lions proper: the one in dexter in profile and in sinister affronté.

The shield has a scroll with a verse from the Quran: "In Tansourou Allaha Yansouroukoum". (Surah Muhammad Verse 7; Arabic: إِنْ تَنْصُرُوا اللَّهَ يَنْصُرْكُمْ, lit. 'if you support Allāh, He will support you')
