= Moroccan Debt Administration =

Entity established in 1904 to manage Morocco's sovereign debt

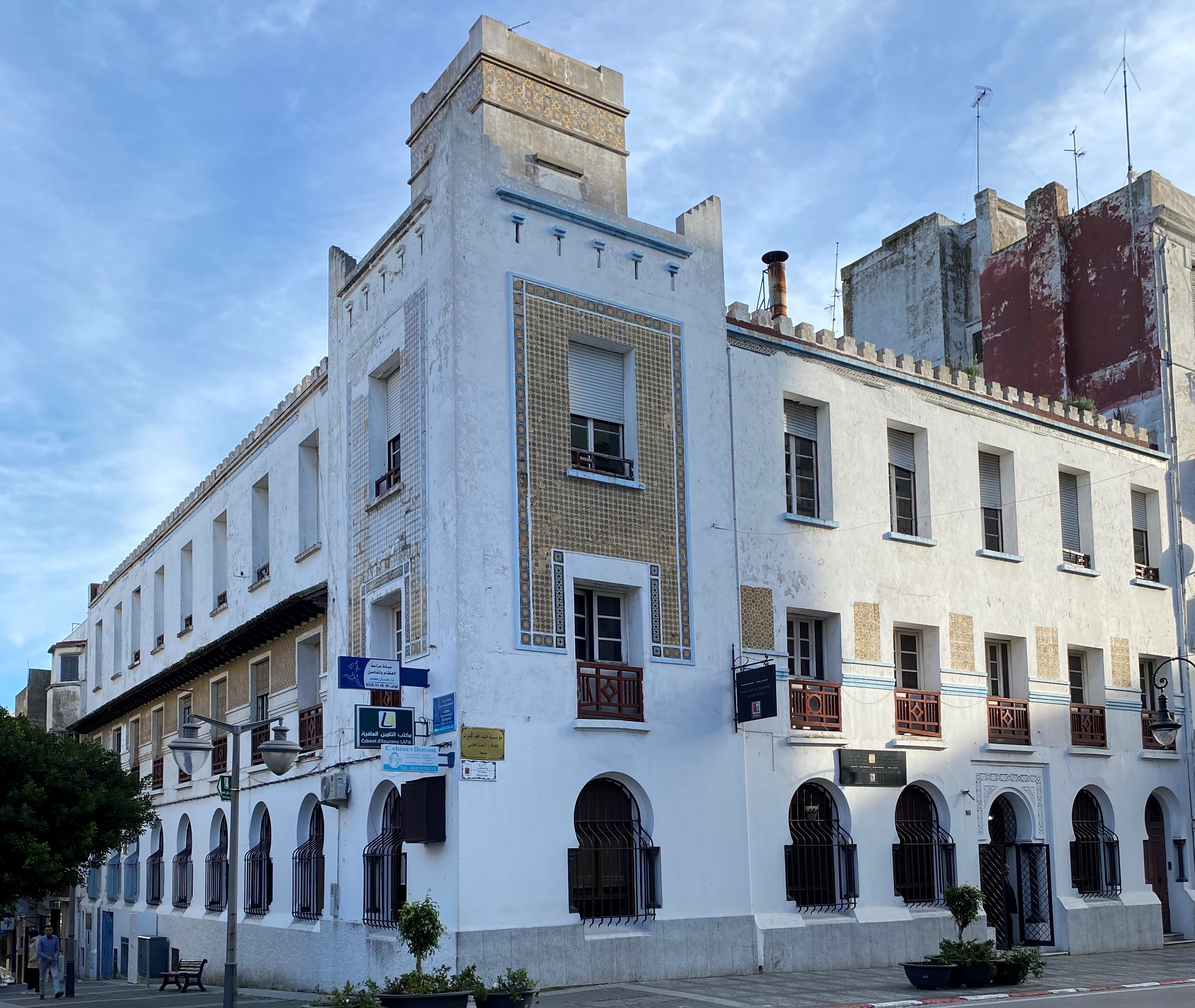
Former building of the Debt Administration or Dar Al-Salaf in Tangier

The Moroccan Debt Administration (French: administration de la dette marocaine), formally known as the Contrôle de la dette from 1904 to 1910 and after that as the Administration du Contrôle de la dette publique mahghzénienne (referring to the Moroccan monarchy as the Makhzen), was an entity set up by the French government in 1904 to administer the sovereign debt of the Moroccan Monarchy.

== History ==
The Moroccan Debt Administration originated in 1904, as Morocco's sovereign debt, which had increased significantly following the Hispano-Moroccan War (1859–1860) and the First Melillan campaign of 1894, was restructured by the Banque de Paris et des Pays-Bas (BPPB) in coordination with the French government. as a consequence, France became the only creditor of the Moroccan government. The loan contract was signed on 12 June 1904 by Moroccan Foreign Minister Si Abdelkrim Ben Slimane, Moroccan Finance Minister Si Mohammed Tazi, and the BPPB's representative Georges Zangarussiano. The loan amount was 62,5 million francs, divided in 125.000 bonds of nominal value 500 francs each, for an interest rate of 5 percent. It was guaranteed by revenue from the Moroccan customs, in the collection of which the Debt Administration would be directly involved. A further loan was negotiated in 1910.

An indirect consequence of the 1904 debt restructuring was the establishment of the State Bank of Morocco in 1907, also in Tangier, following the Algeciras Conference of 1906.

The administration acted on behalf of the private debt consortium, under the auspices of the French government but free from hierarchical authority of the French Consul in Tangier. It was initially led by French diplomat Eugène Regnault, then by Gaston Guiot under whom its expanded into an increasing number of state-like functions, until the Treaty of Fes formally established the French protectorate in Morocco in March 1912. It kept receiving Morocco's customs revenue until 1918, and was still active in 1925.

== Building ==
A dedicated building was erected for the debt administration and completed in 1910, on a major new thoroughfare in Tangier which was then in the process of being created and was thus initially known as the Boulevard de la Dette; it became the Boulevard Pasteur in 1915. It was built in Moorish Revival architecture by the local firm of Desforges & Rousseau.

With the establishment of the Tangier International Zone, the building initially hosted the offices of the zone's International Administration, which stayed there until 1937. Shortly after Moroccan independence in 1957, it was the seat of the Comité International d'Initiative et de Tourisme, an association of businessmen for the improvement of the Tangier economy that issued a monthly publication titled Tanger.

As of 2022, the building, also known as Dar el-Salaf and located at 29 boulevard Pasteur, is the seat of the Regional Tourism Authority (French: Office du Tourisme). It also houses the personal library donated in 1985 to the City of Tangier by influential scholar Abdellah Guennoun, whose volumes were transferred there after his death in 1989.

== See also ==
- 1861 British loan to Morocco
- Chinese Maritime Customs Service
- Caisse de la Dette in Egypt
- Ottoman Public Debt Administration
- International Financial Commission in Greece
