= Ottoman Public Debt Administration =

European-controlled organization

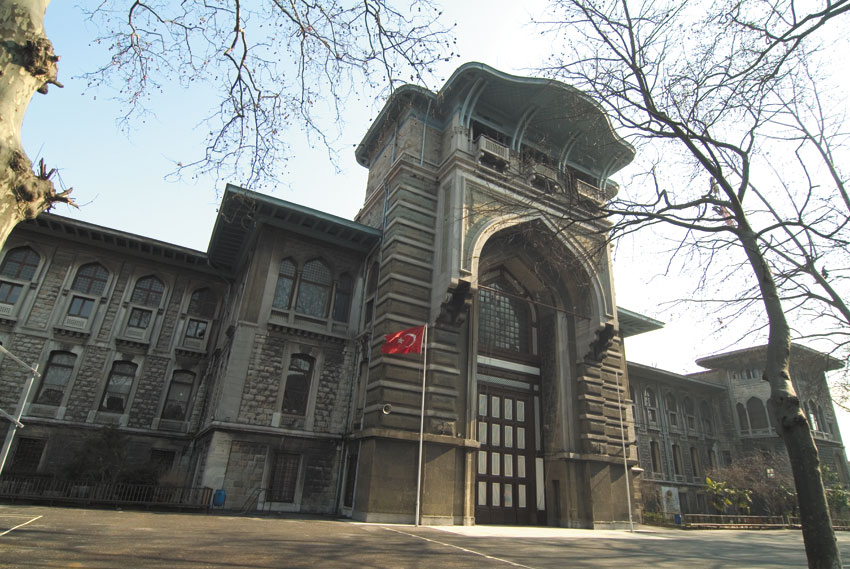
The Istanbul High School building was originally constructed as the Ottoman Public Debt Administration (OPDA) headquarters.

Ottoman Public Debt Administration (Note: Ottoman Turkish: دیون عمومیهٔ عثمانیه واردات مخصصه اداره‌سی, romanized: Düyun-u Umumiye-i Osmaniye Varidat-ı Muhassasa İdaresi, or simply Düyun-u Umumiye as it was popularly known; French: Administration de la Dette Publique Ottomane; German: Öffentliche Schulden des Osmanischen Reichs) (OPDA) was a European-controlled organization that was established in 1881 to collect the payments which the Ottoman Empire owed to European companies in the Ottoman public debt. The OPDA became a vast, essentially independent, bureaucracy within the Ottoman bureaucracy, run by the creditors: Its governing council included one representative each from British, French, German, Austrian, Italian, Dutch, and Ottoman creditors, and one representative from the Ottoman state. It employed 5,000 officials who collected taxes that were then turned over to the European creditors. At its peak it had 9,000 employees, more than the empire's finance ministry.

The OPDA played an important role in Ottoman financial affairs. Also, it was an intermediary with European companies seeking investment opportunities in the Ottoman Empire. In 1900, the OPDA was financing many railways and other industrial projects. The financial and commercial privileges of the non-Muslim foreigners were protected with the capitulations of the Ottoman Empire.

After the dissolution of the Ottoman Empire, between 1918 and 1924 Ottoman revenue stamps overprinted O.P.D.A. or A.D.P.O., or stamps printed with those inscriptions, were issued for use in Palestine, Transjordan, Syria and Lebanon.

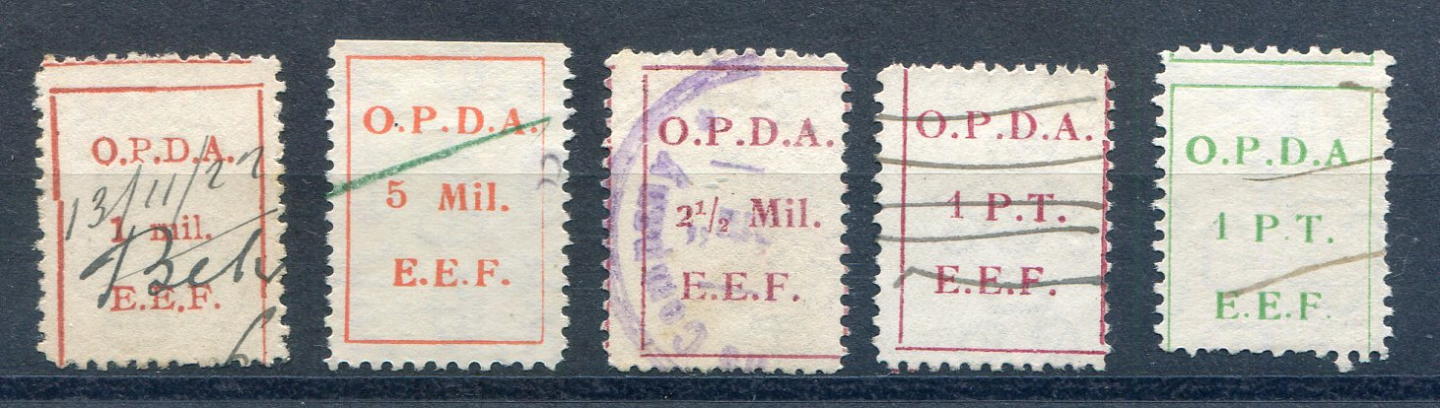
Duty stamps from the Ottoman Public Debt Administration

The OPDA was established by treaty which outlined its powers. The Ottomans agreed to turn over to the OPDA a wide swath of its income sources. The OPDA was provided monopolies on salt and tobacco by the state. It was afforded taxes on stamps, alcohol, fishing, and silk. Though those taxes were afforded only in certain regions, they included the most important Istanbul region. Non-region specific taxes were also provided, notably on shops and stores, and customs duties. Should those sources of income prove insufficient, the OPDA was also empowered to a share of foreign indemnities paid to the Ottomans by various Balkan states as a result of the Treaty of Berlin. The indemnities were of little comfort to the Ottomans anyway, because the treaty had also greatly reduced the size and population of the Empire, and thus its tax base.

Uncertainties in accounting, as well as a knowledge gap between the OPDA and the Ottomans, meant that the precise value of the Ottoman debt was hard to ascertain. The calculation difficulties led to the advancement of statistics and accounting practices. Because the British public was particularly angered by the default and lobbied for the creation of the OPDA, combined with the accounting difficulties, British bondholders may have been overrepresented in the OPDA's repayment scheme.

Although Ottoman Muslims constituted roughly 88–94 percent of the OPDA's employees and received stable salaries, Europeans and Ottoman Christians dominated senior positions. During the crises of 1895–1899 and 1907–1908, the Administration disproportionately expanded its European and non-Muslim staff, due to a fundamental mistrust of Muslim employees. Donald Quataert, argues that these discriminatory policies intensified tensions among Ottoman religious communities and contributed to the deterioration of the empire’s social fabric.

== See also ==
- Ottoman Tobacco Company
- Chinese Maritime Customs Service
- Caisse de la Dette in Egypt
- International Financial Commission in the Kingdom of Greece
- Moroccan Debt Administration
