= French conquest of Morocco =

1907-1934 conflict in North Africa

- Part of the Scramble for Africa
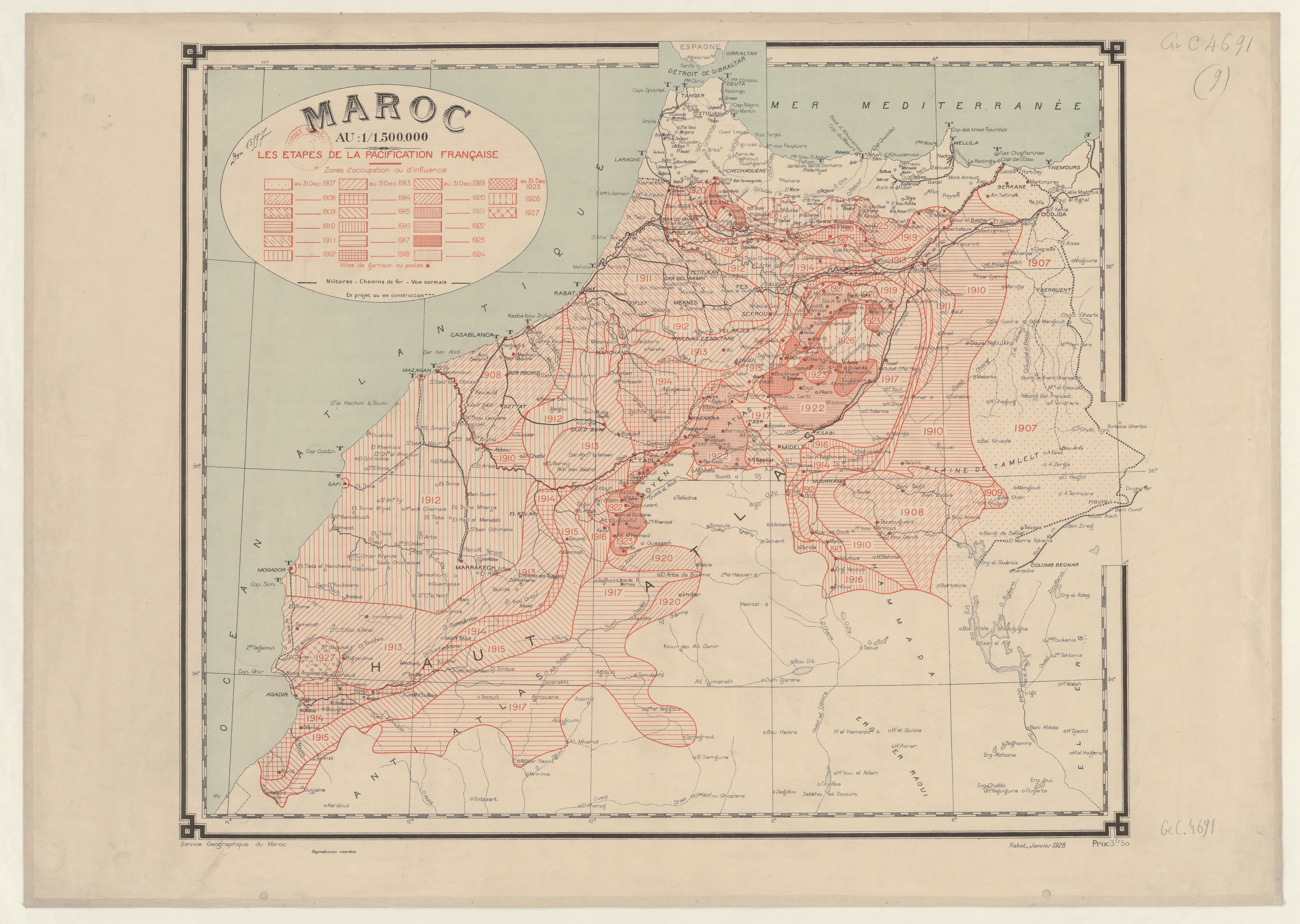
- Pacification of Morocco (1907–1927).
Date	1907–1934
Location	Morocco
Result	French victory: Treaty of Fes; Morocco becomes a French protectorate
Territorial changes	Treaty of Madrid; Partition of Morocco into French and Spanish zones

Belligerents
Pre-1912 Treaty of Fes France: French Algeria; Supported by: Spain	Pre-1912 Treaty of Fes Morocco: Chaouia tribes; Gudfiyya Brotherhood
Post-1912 Treaty of Fes France: French Protectorate in Morocco	Post-1912 Treaty of Fes Hibists Zaian Confederation; Ait Atta; Various other tribes Support: Ottoman Empire (1914–1916); German Empire (1914–1918)

Commanders and leaders
(France) Théophile Delcassé (France) Louis-Hubert Lyautey (France) Paul Prosper Henrys (France) General Poeymirau (France) Charles Mangin (France) René Laverdure † (France) Philippe Pétain	Abd al-Aziz; Abd al-Hafid; Ma al-'Aynayn; Ahmed al-Hiba; Merebbi Rebbu; Mouha ou Hammou Zayani; Moha ou Said; Ali Amhaouch; Hajj Hammou; Abdel-Salam Mohammed; Mhamadi Bojabbar; Assou Oubasslam

Casualties and losses
8,622 French killed 12,000 natives killed 15,000 wounded	100,000

The French conquest of Morocco (Note: Arabic: غزو فرنسا للمغرب, "French invasion of Morocco"; French: Campagne du Maroc, "Morocco campaign"; pacification du Maroc, "Pacification of Morocco"; or guerre du Maroc, "Morocco war".) began with the French Republic occupying the city of Oujda on 29 March 1907. The French launched campaigns against the Sultanate of Morocco which culminated in the signing of the Treaty of Fes and establishment of the French protectorate in Morocco on 30 March 1912. France later concluded, on 27 November, the Treaty of Madrid with the Kingdom of Spain which established the Spanish protectorate in Morocco. The French still conducted a series of military operations to pacify rebellions in Morocco until 1934.

== Background ==
The French Empire considerably expanded their activities in the Sultanate of Morocco after the Battle of Isly (1844). French representatives in Tangier were no longer consuls but chargés d'affaires. The Treaty of Lalla Maghnia signed in March 1845 between France and Morocco recognized the boundary existing before 1830 between Algeria and Morocco as being still binding. The oasis of Figuig was recognized in the same treaty as being Moroccan and the oasis of Aïn Séfra as being Algerian. But the French refused to delineate the frontier to the south of Figuig on the ground that a frontier was superfluous in uninhabited desert land. The Paris Revolution of 1848 temporarily weakened French diplomacy. France's desire to reassert her influence in Morocco led to the Bombardment of Salé in November 1851. In 1859 French troops occupied the oasis of Sidi Yahia, a place seven kilometres from Oujda. In 1860 a French post office was founded in Tangier as a branch of the postal service of Oran. While providing a useful service to European and Moroccan merchants, the existence of the foreign post offices constituted an enlargement of the normal extraterritorial rights and an encroachment upon Moroccan Government functions.

From the 1850s, politicians in France and the authorities in Algeria started to advocate the creation of military posts in the southern parts of the region of Oran and beyond it for the purpose of controlling the trans-Saharan trade and eventually uniting the French colonies of Algeria and the Senegal. After the Hispano-Moroccan War (1859–1860), the Kingdom of Spain joined with the United Kingdom to oppose France, who from her position in Algeria seemed then to be the greatest threat to Morocco. Popular support in both France and in Algeria for a Saharan conquest came into being in 1875, after a French engineer, Duponchel, had suggested that the commerce of the Sahara and of central Africa might be opened up to French interests by the construction of a Trans-Saharan Railway. Initially, the idea was to put such a railroad through the Saharan region lying east of the Gourara-Touat-Tidikelt. Other than British and Spanish hostilities, France had to also contend with the Kingdom of Italy's hostility, as the Italians had been angered by the French military intervention in Tunisia in 1881. In 1881 France established a military post in Aïn Séfra. This act solidified French control over all of the ksour of the Saharan Atlas that had been given to Algeria by the Treaty of Lalla Maghnia. The next year, in 1882, the French Government requested from the Moroccans permission to construct the Trans-Saharan Railroad along the route leading from the Oued Zousfana to the Touat. The Moroccans, however, refused. Fearing that the French might nevertheless continue their advance towards the south, in 1883, the Moroccans placed an amel (a governor) at the oasis of Figuig, on the upper reaches of the Oued Zousfana. In 1885 French troops crossed the crest of the Saharan Atlas and began to construct a post at Djéniene Bourzeg, a water hole strategically situated in a mountain corridor that led directly to the valley of the Zousfana to the south of Figuig. Djéniene Bourzeg was in a disputable area; and while an initial Moroccan protest had first induced the French to withdraw, the Moroccans, in November 1886 agreed to recognize the locale as being in Algerian territory. Britain, Spain and Italy in 1887 had sent a note to Moulay Hassan, assuring him that they desired to see maintained both the independence and the territorial integrity of his country. By the 1890s, the predominant French interest was already directed towards the establishment of a French protectorate over Morocco; and it was feared that an overt action against the Saharan territories which Morocco claimed would antagonize not merely the Moroccans, but also the other European powers who had become equally involved in Moroccan affairs.

== Prelude ==
=== South-Oranese Campaign (1899–1903) ===
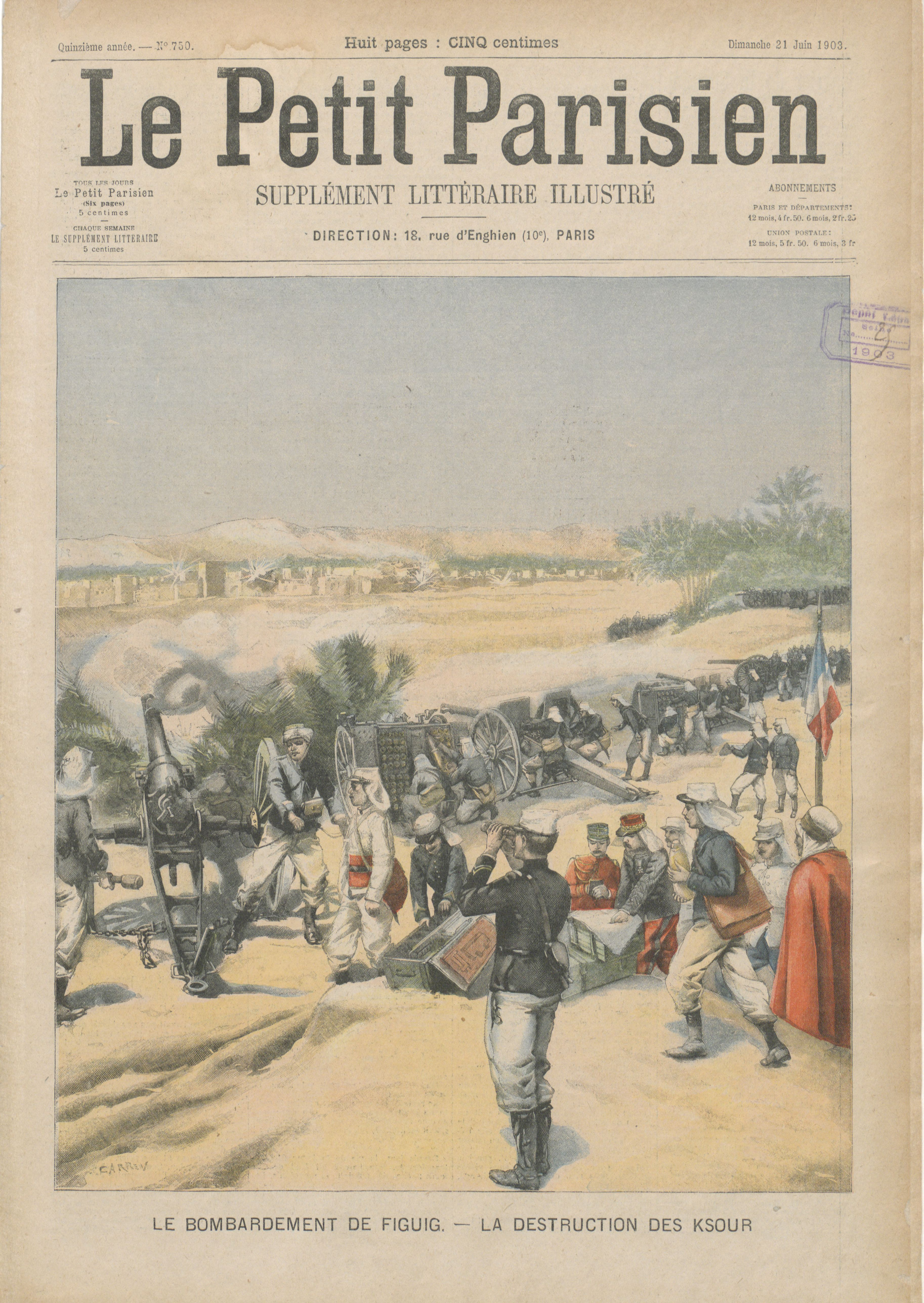
Le Petit Parisien: General O'Connor's bombardment of Ksar Zenaga in the Figuig oasis in 1903.

After Théophile Delcassé became foreign minister in 1898, the French followed a more aggressive policy of penetration. In executing this policy they worked to prevent the reformation of the Moroccan Government under Moulay Abd al-Aziz while at the same time drawing it towards greater recognition of France's special interests in Morocco by continually raising problems connected with incidents on the frontier with Algeria. The actual intervention in the Gourara-Tuat-Tidikelt did not take place until the very end of 1899. The military contingent escorting the mission quickly routed the Saharans and took advantage of the opportunity to occupy the oasis of Aïn Salah. An armed conflict opposed French troops to the Aït Khabbash, a fraction of the Aït Ounbgui khams of the Aït Atta confederation. The conflict ended by the annexation of the Touat-Gourara-Tidikelt complex to Algeria by France in 1901. Attacks by the Beni Guil, Doui Menia, Oulad Djerir, Aït Atta, and by pillagers emanating from Figuig continued on the frontier throughout all of the latter part of 1902 and during much of the year 1903. It was not until April 1903 that Paris finally agreed that the Algerian military forces could make a "police action" west of the Zousfana line.

On 31 May 1903, the Governor-General of Algeria Charles Jonnart was making an inspection tour of the frontier area when he was shot at in the vicinity of Figuig. On June 8 Figuig was bombarded. Hubert Lyautey wished to establish and place military posts as far as possible towards the areas considered to be Moroccan. In October 1903, after further attacks had been perpetrated against the French troops stationed in the Zousfana, Paris agreed to the installation of a post west Béchar. Béchar had been one of the locales utilized most frequently as a refuge by the nomads who had attacked the Zousfana line.

=== French agreements on Morocco (1900–1904) ===
In 1900 the French agreed to recognize the predominance of Italy's interests in Tripolitania and Cyrenaica in exchange for an Italian assurance that, as far as they were concerned, France might have a "free hand" in Morocco. Negotiations with Spain over Morocco failed in 1902 because of disagreement over the limits of the future Spanish zone and the insistence of the French on reserving to themselves the right of intervention in it. The Franco-British agreement reached on 8 April 1904 involved the recognition of the predominant position of France in Morocco in exchange for France's recognition of the permanency of Britain's position in Egypt. The Franco-British agreement also specified a zone to be entrusted to Spain when it became necessary for France to occupy Morocco, and subsequent British pressure on Spain to accept France's terms.

=== Tangier Crisis (1905–1906) ===
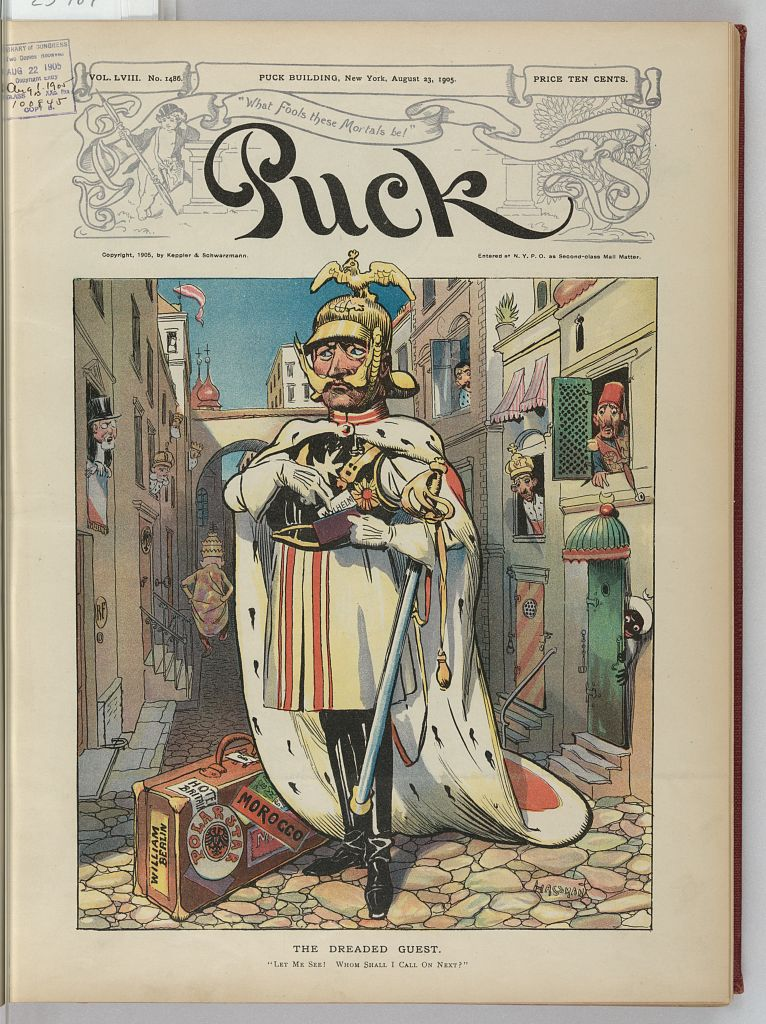
Puck Magazine caricature of Wilhelm II's visit of Tangier.

The German Empire's influence and commerce in Morocco expanded after concluding a commercial treaty with Sultan Moulay Hassan in 1890. The Germans tried to thwart the implementation of the Franco-British agreement on Morocco, more for reasons connected with the emerging system of alliance in Europe than for any specific political aims they had in Morocco itself. At the time of the negotiations between Spain and France in 1902 and 1904 the Germans encouraged Spain to insist on being allowed to police Tangier, whose future international character was a central issue already accepted by the French and the British. Since 1904 the German Empire directed its efforts towards the internationalization of the Moroccan question. With this intention Kaiser Wilhelm II made a visit to Tangier on 31 March 1905, and stated while there that he regarded Sultan Moulay Abd al-Aziz as an independent ruler, warned against hasty reforms (a reference to France's mandate in the 1904 agreement with Britain to ‘reform’ the Moroccan structure), and warned that Germany's interests in Morocco would be protected.

Britain, Belgium and France made defensive preparations — the French reinforced units, trained reservists and procured arms — to signal their determination. Germany only took similar limited steps late in the crisis. Despite these moves, neither side desired war. The French knew that they were weak and did not wish to provoke the Germans, and Delcassé, the foreign minister, who alone advocated firmness, was forced to resign from the cabinet. Bernhard von Bülow, the German chancellor, alive to the danger of escalation, had no intention of risking a European war over African concessions.

The Kaiser's visit was followed by the German demand that an international conference on Morocco be convened. The French, anxious to avoid conflict with Germany, and relying on the diplomatic support of Britain, Spain and Italy, agreed to the demand in July.

=== Algeciras Conference (1906) ===
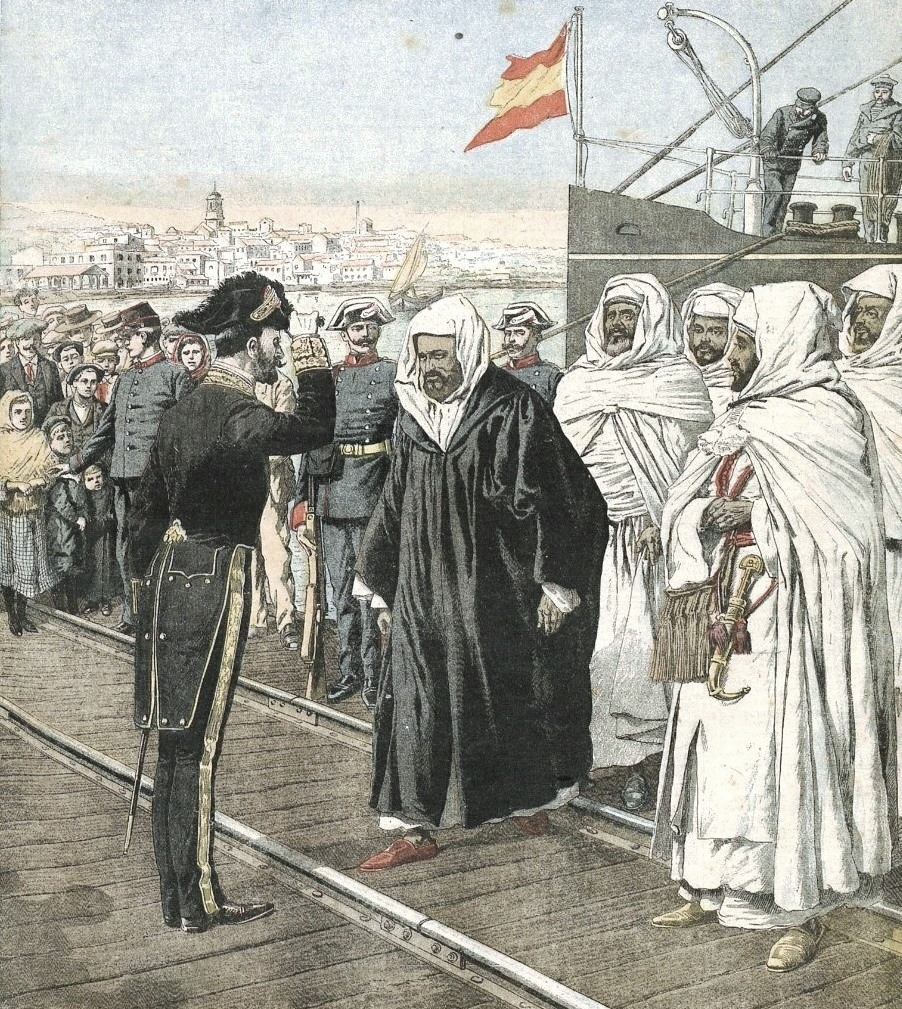
Arrival of the Moroccan ambassadors in Algeciras.

The Moroccan conference, attended by the representatives of thirteen countries, was opened in Algeciras on 16 January 1906. Its objectives, as stated in the opening session by its president, the Duke of Almodóvar del Río Juan Manuel Sánchez, were to prepare a programme of reform for Morocco that would preserve the sultan's sovereignty and Morocco's territorial integrity, and maintain the policy of the open door in commercial activity. As the principal consideration in the minds of the delegates was the balance of power in Europe, it proved difficult to agree on the share that each of the powers represented was to have in carrying out the so-called reforms.

After nearly three months of diplomatic wrangling the powers adopted the Act of Algeciras on 7 April which provided for ‘reforms’ amounting to a joint Franco-Spanish control of Morocco's police and finances. The policing of the major Moroccan ports was entrusted to France and Spain, with the Spaniards in charge of Tétouan and Larache, the French of Safi, Rabat, El Jadida, and Essaouira, and both French and Spanish policemen in Casablanca and Tangier. A Swiss officer stationed in Tangier was to act as inspector of the foreign police forces and to report to the sultan and the diplomatic corps in Tangier. The Act also provided for the creation of a Moroccan state bank financed by the powers, with France controlling it by virtue of providing a third of the capital.

The close Anglo-French collaboration forced Berlin to accept a diplomatic defeat. This not only confirmed Berlin's isolation — only Austria-Hungary offered support — but more importantly France and Britain strengthened the Entente. The sultan, realizing that Britain had relinquished her role as protector of the Moroccan makhzen and seeing Germany unable to restrain France, accepted the Act of Algeciras. But the Moroccans were provoked by the increasing activities of Europeans in the country. In their attacks on Europeans, they provided France and Spain with the excuse for military intervention.

== War against the sultanate ==
=== Occupation of Oujda (1907) ===
Following the assassination of the French physician Émile Mauchamp, a French physician suspected espionage and conspiring to lay the groundwork for French takeover of Morocco, in Marrakesh on 19 March 1907, French general Hubert Lyautey led soldiers across the border from French-occupied Algeria to occupy the important town of Oujda on March 29.

=== Bombardment of Casablanca (1907) and Chaouia campaign (1907–1908) ===
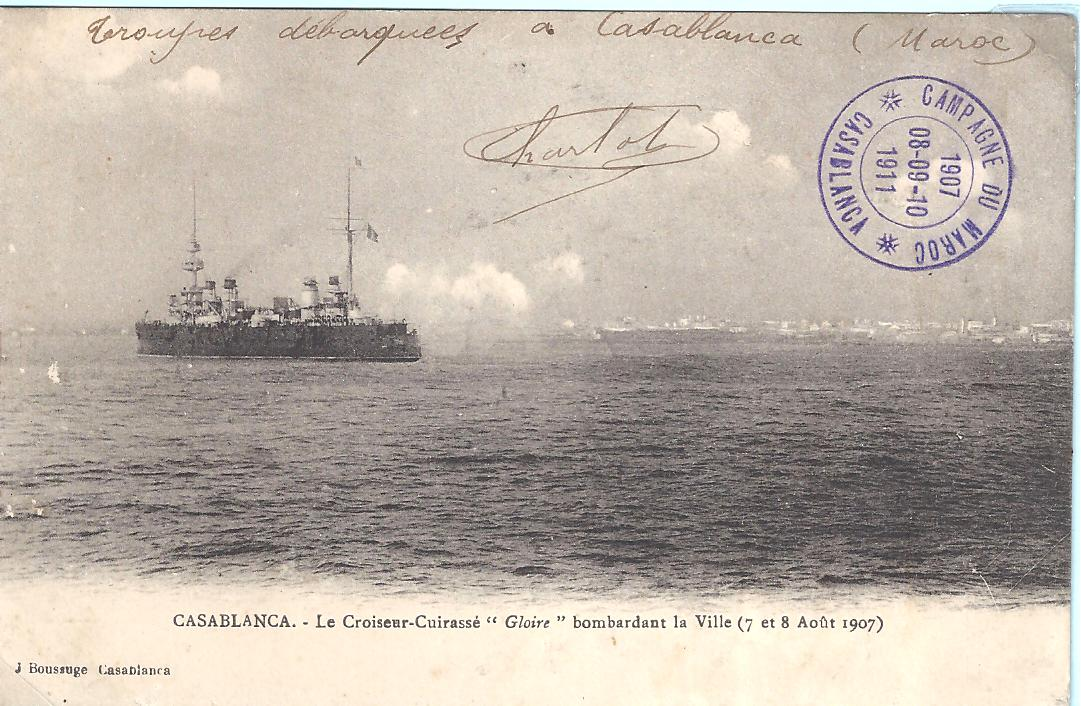
Bombardment of Casablanca, 1907

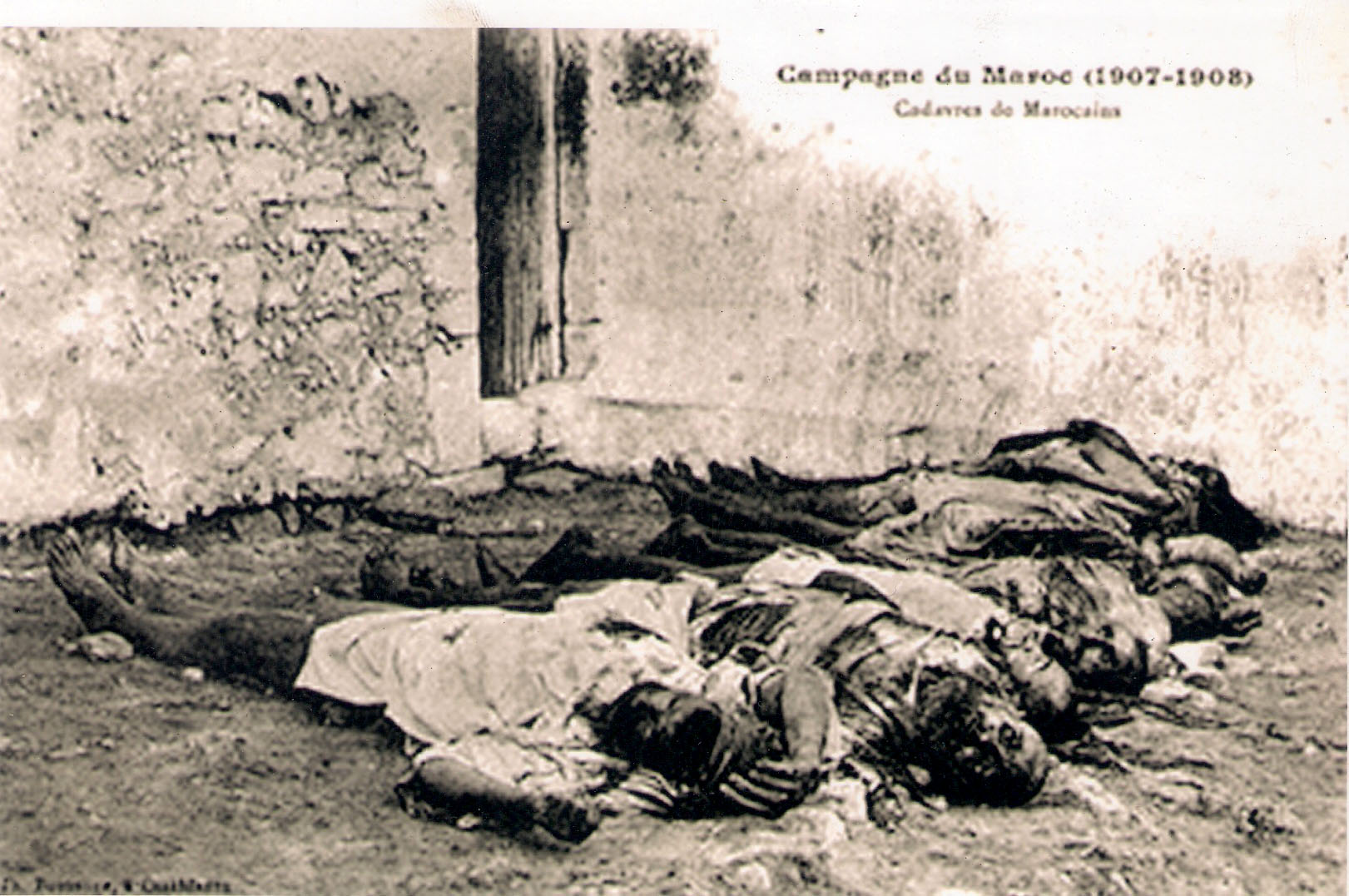
Postcard depicting the corpses of Moroccans during the 1907–1908 campaign

The French Compaganie Marocaine began works in May 1907 in the port of Casablanca. Neighbouring Chaouia tribesmen and Muslims from Casablanca attacked the European workmen, killing nine of them. This rebellion by the tribes of the Chaouia is known as the Chaouia campaign and was the first time since the Battle of Isly that the French and Moroccans engaged with each other in the battlefield. The French opened a western front on 5 August 1907 with the Bombardment of Casablanca. 3,000 French and 500 Spanish troops were landed. The dispatch of the Spanish troops was a formality intended to give to the intervention the character of a police operation in accordance with the joint Franco-Spanish mandate to police the town under the Act of Algeciras.While the Spanish troops took no part in fighting, the French forces under General Drude, and then under General d'Amade, during 1907 and 1908 proceeded to subjugate the Chaouia region around Casablanca.

The French landing in Chaouia led the Chaouia tribes to hold several assemblies with the political figure Abu Azzawi, a sharif from the Mzab playing a leading role. This led them to send a letter to Abd al-Hafid urging him to "restore Islam from the low estate into which it had fallen" sparking the beginning of the Hafidiya.

=== Hafidiya (1907–1908) ===
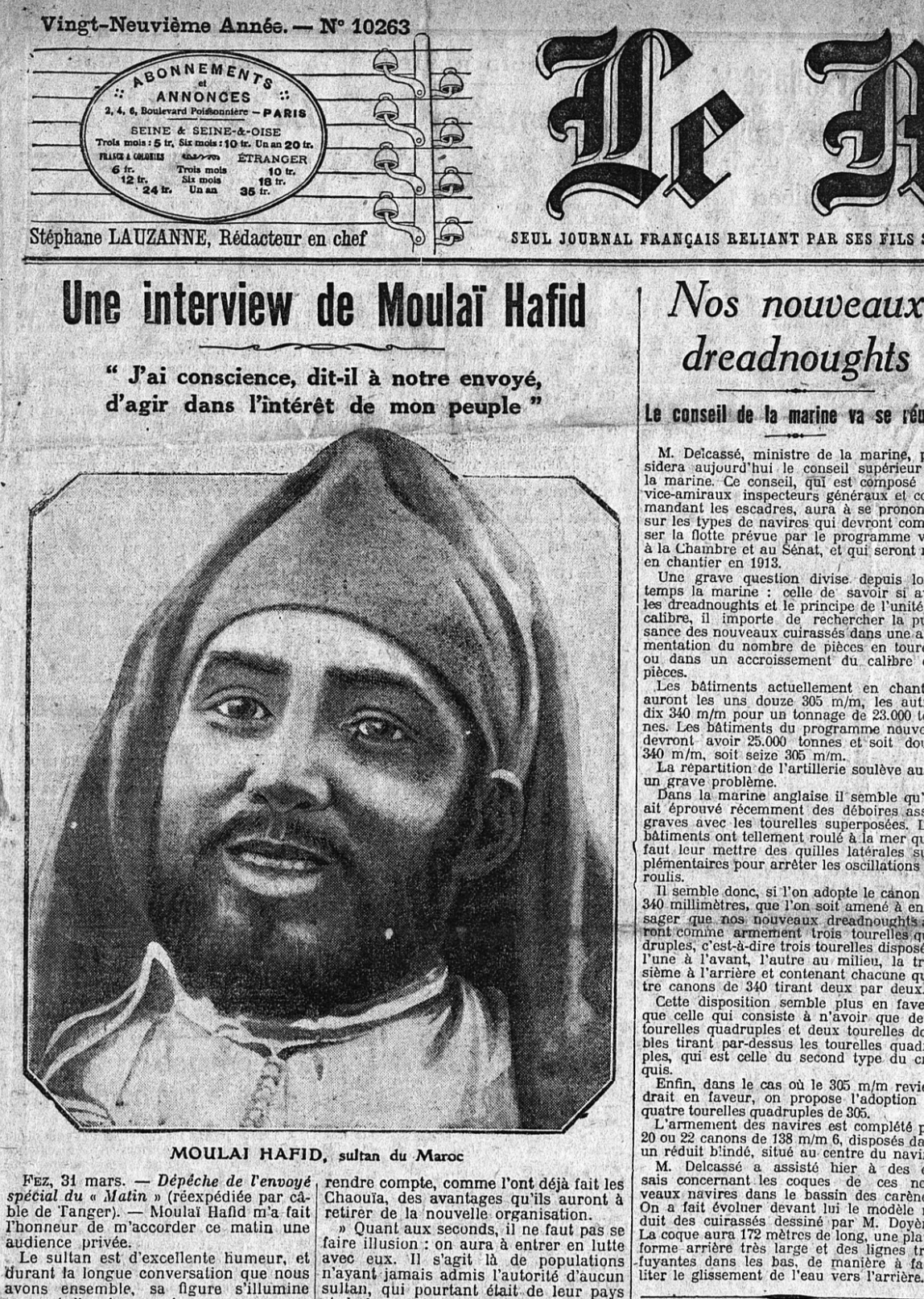
Interview with Sultan Moulay Abd al-Hafid on the French daily newspaper Le Matin (1912).

Deeply Alarmed by the inability of Sultan Moulay Abd al-Aziz to hold the country together, Abd al-Hafid, the elder brother of the sultan and khalifa in Marrakesh, was proclaimed Sultan in Marrakesh on 16 August 1907. Following the Conditioned Bay'ah of Fes January 1908, Abd al-Hafid had the support of spiritual authorities such as the al-Kattanis and close relations with the so-called Lords of the Atlas, a loose collection of Berber clans who ruled the High Atlas region with impunity. Foremost among them were the Glawi family, headed by Madani al-Glawi. In January 1908, the 'Ulama of Fes led by Muhammad al-Kattani deposed Abd al-Aziz and imposed a conditioned Bay'ah on Abd al-Hafid to become sultan. The bay'ah made a series of demands: that the new sultan should undertake the jihad neglected by his predecessor; that he liberate Oujda and Casablanca and end the protégé system.

The assent of the Fes 'ulama turned the tide for Abd al-Hafid, and soon the other imperial cities followed suit. Yet the war of succession dragged on for another six months as Abd al-Aiz continued his resistance, egged on by the French. The conflict ended on 19 August 1908 at the Battle of Marrakesh on the road between Rabat and Marrakesh, when the deposed sultan's mahallah was ambushed by partisans of his brother, and his soldiers melted away in the torrid summer heat. Abandoned by his men, his jallaba shredded by bullets, the ex-sultan fled to the safety of French-held Casablanca, where he announced his abdication two days later.

=== French expansion (1908–1911) ===
In 1908 the French desert post of Colomb-Béchar was attacked by Moulay Lahsen, a Sufi shaykh who mobilized the population of the eastern High Atlas in a jihad against the French. After repulsing this attack the French forces advanced into south-eastern Morocco and established a base at Boudenib. In the vital issue of opposing European expansion Abd al-Hafid proved as ineffective as his brother. On 8 February 1909, a further Franco-German agreement reaffirmed Morocco's independence while recognizing France's "special political interests" and Germany's economic interests in North Africa. Further north the French forces at Oujda advanced westwards, established a base at Taourirt in June 1910 and started to send patrols along the way leading to Fes. By 1911, the French campaign from the east, through what is now the southwest of Algeria, had reached the Ziz River, 200 miles within the Moroccan border. This effectively put a large swath of the pre-Saharan area in the southeast of Morocco under French control.

=== Spanish campaigns (1908–1912) ===
Following the allowance of its interests and recognition of its influence in northern Morocco through the Entente Cordiale (1904), Algeciras Conference (1906) and the Pact of Cartagena (1907), Spain occupied Ras Kebdana, a town near the Moulouya River, in March 1908. The enduring instability in the Rif threatened Melilla, and further Riffian attacks on the Spanish Rif Mines Company prompted the military governor of Melilla José Marina Vega to launch the Second Melillan campaign (1909). In December 1910 the King of Spain made a visit to Mellila, then inspected construction works in the Zaffarin islands, and reviewed troops in Selouane. While the Spaniards were taking control of northern Morocco, the French were expanding the area under their control. In June 1911, Spanish troops occupied Larache and Ksar el-Kebir. Mohammed Ameziane's call for a jihad against the Spanish occupation in the eastern Rif and an attack on a group of Spanish military personnel undertaking topographic works at a position near Ishafen, near the Kert River, led to the Kert campaign (1911–1912).

=== Fes Rebellion (1911) ===
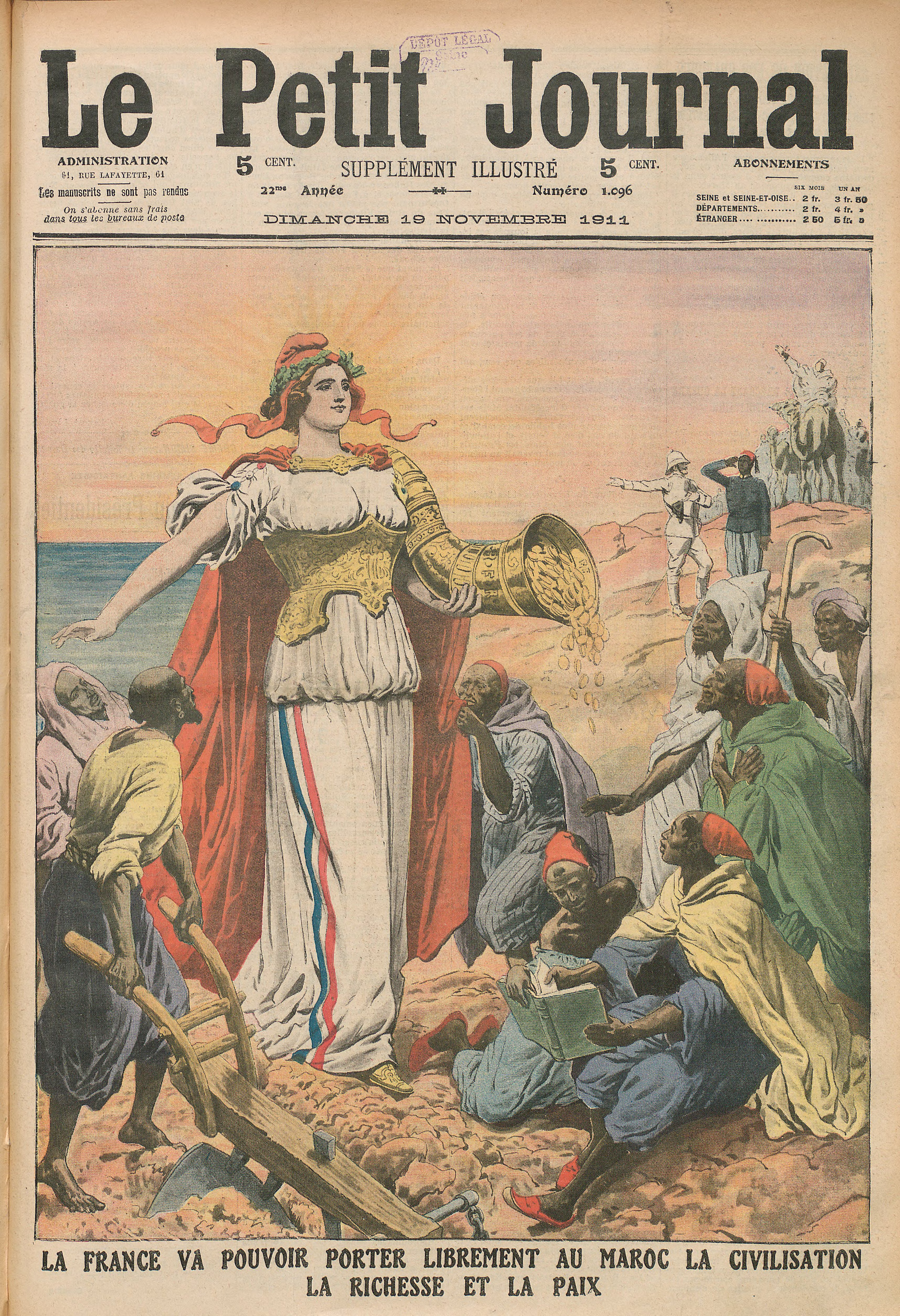
Le Petit Journal French colonial Propaganda: "France will be able to freely bring civilization, wealth and peace to Morocco."

After 1910, Sultan Moulay Abd al-Hafid, who had aroused a strong religious sense of opposition to European domination, was viewed, like Abd al-Aziz before him, as a tool in the hands of the Europeans. In 1911 the Shrarda and Banu Mtir tribes to the north and south of Meknes respectively, became alarmed by the French expansion in their direction from the west and rose in rebellion. Simultaneously, a new member of the Alawite house, Moulay al-Zayn, was proclaimed Sultan in Meknes on 17 April. As the tribes advanced on Fes, the French, in violation of the Algeciras agreement, were able to intervene on the pretext of defending the sultan and the Europeans in the capital. A French column under General Moinier repulsed the tribes and occupied Meknes after taking Moulay al-Zayn captive on 8 June. A large French expeditionary force entered Fes on 21 May 1911. Both Spain and Germany registered a protest.

=== Agadir Crisis (1911) ===
Puck Magazine caricature of the French President Armand Fallières and the German Emperor Wilhelm II aiming for the dove of peace on the platform of the Second Moroccan Crisis.

The Second Moroccan Crisis (1911) was precipitated when the German gunboat Panther was sent to Agadir on July 1, 1911, ostensibly to protect German interests during the local native uprising in Morocco but in reality to cow the French. Germany notified France and the other Powers that German business houses, alarmed at the fermentation among the natives caused by recent events, had asked for protection for their life and property in southern Morocco; the German Government had therefore sent a warship to Agadir, which would withdraw as soon as affairs in Morocco had calmed down. It was true that German firms had petitioned the Foreign Office to protect their interests in southern Morocco, but it is clear that Alfred von Kiderlen-Waechter, the German State Secretary for Foreign Affairs, was using this merely as a pretext. His real motive was to bring the French to the point of making a generous offer of Congo territory, and to emphasize to the Powers that the Algeciras Act had broken down.

Many weeks before the Panther went to Agadir, Sir Edward Grey, the British Secretary of State for Foreign Affairs, had feared that Germany meant to seek her compensation in West Morocco and establish the naval base on the Atlantic coast. To this England had been resolutely opposed for years; it had been one of her main motives for supporting France in Morocco. Unlike in 1905–1906, the two alliance blocs, the Triple Entente (France, United Kingdom and Russia) and the Central Powers (Germany, Austria-Hungary and the Ottoman Empire) were now more evenly matched in armaments, and the Entente took yet more extensive, though still defensive, military measures in a display of determination. London, alarmed that it had lost track of the German fleet for a time, brought the Royal Navy to a high state of alert. German restraint again made for a peaceful outcome: the Germans avoided provocative military moves and accepted an unfavourable compromise.

The Franco-German Convention of 4 November 1911 concluded the Agadir Crisis, in which France was given rights to a protectorship over Morocco and, in return, Germany was given strips of territory from the French Congo and French Equatorial Africa, comprising the Neukamerun (part of the German colony of Kamerun). Spain at first objected; but, through the intervention of Great Britain, a Franco-Spanish Treaty was concluded on 27 November 1912, slightly revising the previous Franco-Spanish boundaries in Morocco. The negotiations of 1911–12 between the powers also led up to the eventual internationalization of the Tangier zone, consisting of Tangier and its environs, in 1923.

=== Treaty of Fes (1912) ===
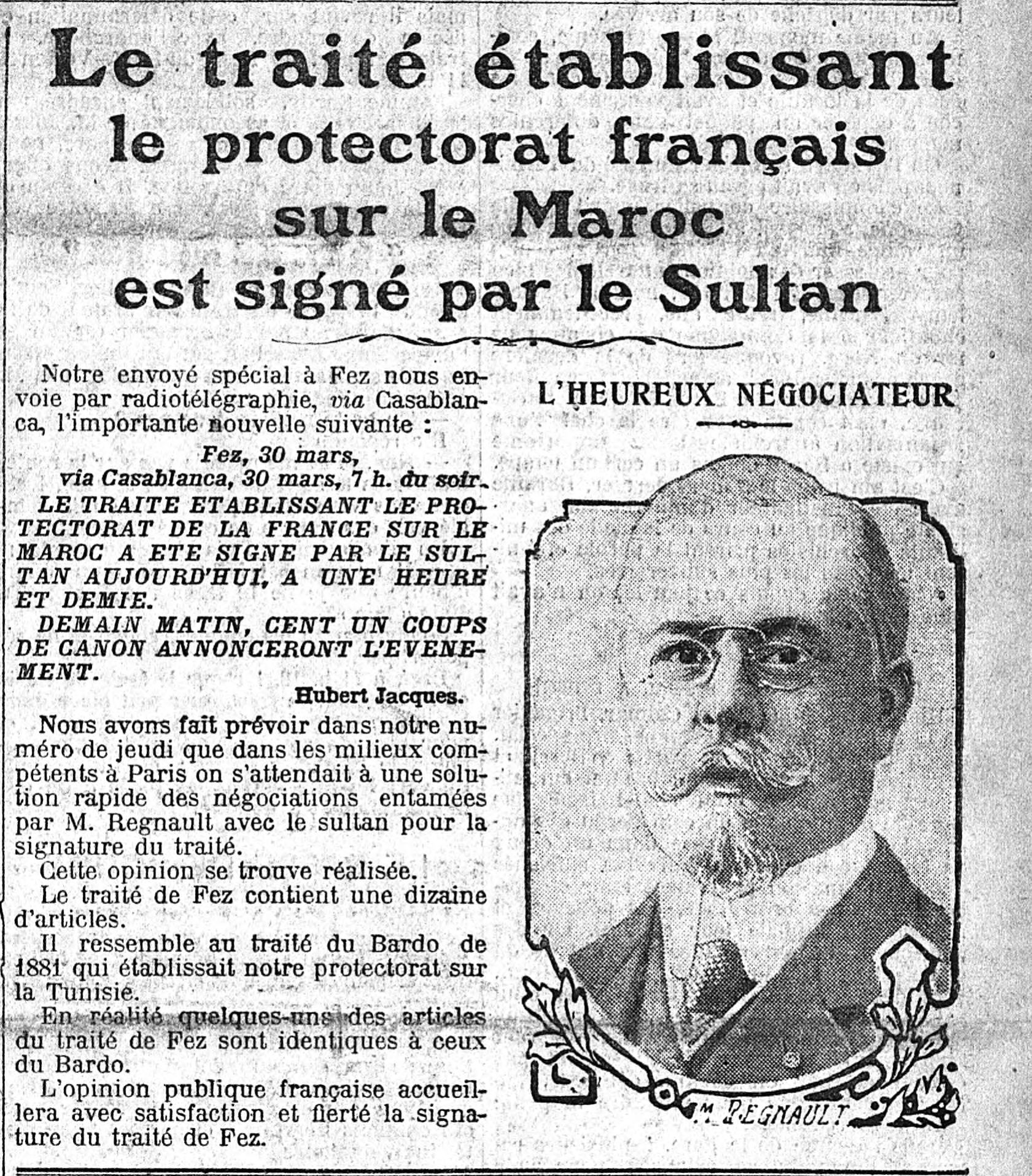
Page of the daily newspaper Le Matin on the treaty establishing the French protectorate over Morocco.

The Treaty of Fes was signed by Sultan Moulay Abd al-Hafid and French diplomat Eugène Regnault on 30 March 1912 in the Mnebhi Palace in Fes and established the French protectorate in Morocco. Moroccan officials believed that Morocco would be given a regime similar to that of British Egypt, with considerable autonomy in crucial areas like justice and the internal workings of the administration. However, the Treaty of Fes was modeled explicitly upon the Treaty of Bardo, which had established the French protectorate of Tunisia in 1881. By its terms the sultan was to be reduced to a position approximating that of the Bey of Tunis.

The Treaty for the Organization of the French Protectorate in the Sherifien Empire provided that the French government would establish in cooperation with the sultan "a new regime comprising the administrative, judicial, educational, economic, financial, and military reforms which the French government may see fir to introduce within the Moroccan territory." While preserving the religious status and traditional prestige of the sultan, the French would organize a reformed sharifian Makhzen. Measures of the new regime would be established by a zahir of the sultan upon the proposal of the French government, represented by a resident general, who was empowered to act as the sole intermediary between the sultan and foreign representatives.

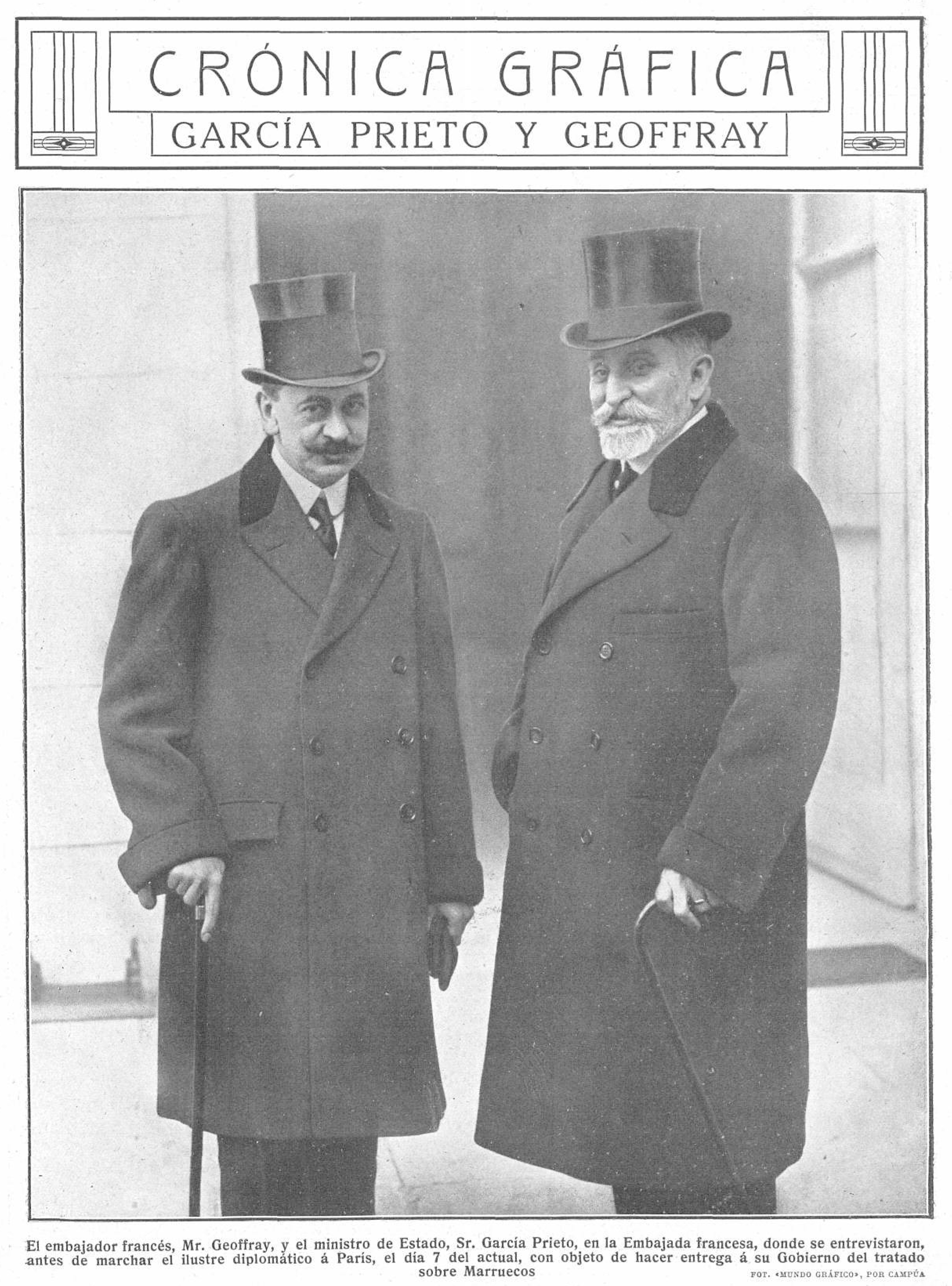
Signatories of the 27 November 1912 Treaty Between France and Spain Regarding Morocco, Spanish Minister of State García Prieto and French ambassador Léon Geoffray.

The French also inherited the division of Morocco into Bled el-Makhzen and Bled es-Siba. Lyautey was quick to realize that the Bled el-Makhzen was, in his expression, the Maroc utile, the part containing the fertile lands and the mineral resources which the future settlers and the entrepreneurs would want to exploit. Priority was consequently given in the extension of French control to the former Bled el-Makhzen, comprising the coastal plains and the regions of Fes, Meknes and Oujda. But since Bled es-Siba was inhabited mostly by Berber mountaineers, Lyautey's conservatism, as well as political expediency, led him to keep the Berbers isolated from the predominantly Arabized lowlands. The outcome of Lyautey's policy was to create two distinct reservations, a Berber one mostly in the mountainous regions, and a traditional Islamic one in the cities of the Maroc utile, existing side by side with a dynamic European community undertaking the rapid development of the country's resources to its won advantage. On 28 April Hubert Lyautey was made the first Resident-General of France in Morocco. The Treaty of Fes also specified that Spanish interests and possessions in Morocco would be recognized following bilateral negotiations between France and Spain. It also accepted the existing special international status of Tangier. The Treaty Between France and Spain Regarding Morocco, concluded on 27 November, established a Spanish protectorate over the northern coastal zone and the Rif, as well as over the Tarfaya area south of the Draa River where the sultan remained nominally the sovereign and was represented by the vice regent under the control of the Spanish high commission.

=== Abdication of Abd al-Hafid (1912) ===
The Fez riots provoked uprisings across northern Morocco. Tribal armies in the north promptly besieged the French colonial forces, strung out on the line between Casablanca and Fez. Changing course, the sultan Abd al-Hafid himself entered into contact with the rebels, prompting Lyautey to force him to abdicate the throne on 11 August 1912 in favor of his more pliable brother, Yusuf.

== Pacification of the rebellions ==
=== Bloody Days of Fes ===
Lyautey was appointed in May to replace Regnault, who had negotiated the Treaty of Fes with Sultan Moulay Abd al-Hafid, because the situation in the region of Fes required prompt military action. Lyautey was able to disperse the tribesmen surrounding Fes, control agitation in the city itself, and start the conquest of the remaining parts of the Maroc utile.

On 17 April 1912, Moroccan infantrymen mutinied in the French garrison in Fez. The Moroccans were unable to take the city and were defeated by a French relief force. In late May 1912, Moroccan forces unsuccessfully attacked the enhanced French garrison at Fez in the Siege of Fez (1912).

=== Battle of Sidi Bou Othman ===
In the Battle of Sidi Bou Othman in 1912, the French defeated Ahmed al-Hiba and captured Marrakesh.

=== Zaian War ===
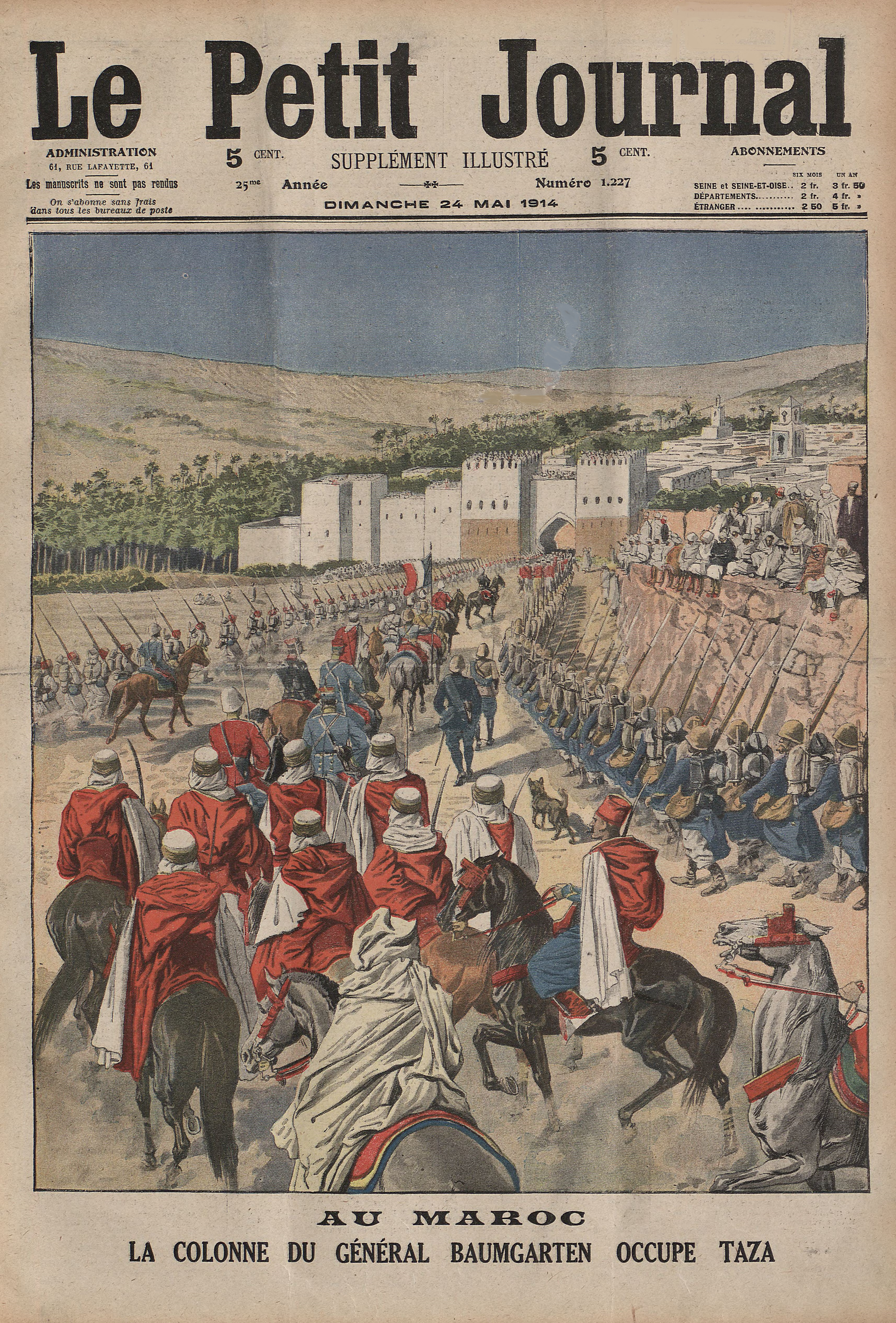
Le Petit Journal: French occupation of Taza in May 1914.

The Zaian Confederation of Berber tribes in Morocco fought a war of opposition against the French between 1914 and 1921. Resident-General Louis-Hubert Lyautey sought to extend French influence eastwards through the Middle Atlas mountains towards French Algeria. This was opposed by the Zaians, led by Mouha ou Hammou Zayani. The war began well for the French, who quickly took the key towns of Taza and Khenifra. Despite the loss of their base at Khénifra, the Zaians inflicted heavy losses on the French. The capture of Taza in May 1914 enabled the French to establish contact between their forces in eastern Morocco and those in the west.

With the outbreak of the First World War, France withdrew troops for service in Europe, and they lost more than 600 in the Battle of El Herri. Over the following four years, the French retained most of their territory despite the Central Powers' intelligence and financial support to the Zaian Confederation and continual raids and skirmishes reducing scarce French manpower.

After the signing of the Armistice with Germany in November 1918, significant forces of tribesmen remained opposed to French rule. The French resumed their offensive in the Khenifra area in 1920, establishing a series of blockhouses to limit the Zaians' freedom of movement. They opened negotiations with Hammou's sons, persuading three of them, along with many of their followers, to submit to French rule. A split in the Zaian Confederation between those who supported submission and those still opposed led to infighting and the death of Hammou in Spring 1921. The French reacted with a three-pronged attack into the Middle Atlas that resulted in the French establishing a permanent control of the area. Some tribesmen, led by Moha ou Said, fled to the High Atlas and continued a guerrilla war against the French well into the 1930s.

=== Rif War ===
Sultan Yusef's reign, from 1912 to 1927, was turbulent and marked with frequent uprisings against Spain and France. The most serious of these was a Berber uprising in the Rif Mountains, led by Abd el-Krim, who managed to establish a republic in the Rif. Though this rebellion began in the Spanish-controlled area in the north, it reached the French-controlled area. A coalition of France and Spain finally defeated the rebels in 1926.

=== Battle of Bougafer ===
The Ait Atta's fierce resistance against the French entry into Morocco until 1933 was famous especially for the Ait Atta's valour during the Battle of Bougafer under the forces of Assou Oubasslam. The Battle of Bougafer was the final battle that the Ait Atta fought and one of the hardest the French fought during their pacification of Morocco. The men who were prepared to stay resisting rallied at Taghya n-Ilimshan and they moved south into the Jbel Saghro. Assou Oubasslam's reputation for toughness, directness and truthfulness was already known to the French and the three French generals in charge of finally defeating the Ait Atta offered to give him what he wanted but he rejected their offers. The French used Ait Atta tribesmen who already submitted to fight against Oubasslam's forces which meant that there were low casualty figures for French officers. Eventually, people started to surrender and defect and after the third defection, Assou Oubasslam with his Ilimshan decided to negotiate. On March 25, they laid down their arms in front of General Antoine Huré, Georges Catroux and Henri Giraud and surrendered. In order to appease the Ait Atta, the French authorities allowed the villages and gardens the Ait Atta conquered from neighbouring groups to be legitimately granted to them by the protectorate.

== See also ==
- France–Morocco relations
- Franco-Moroccan War
- French conquest of Algeria
- French conquest of Tunisia
- Pact of Cartagena

== Bibliography ==
=== Books ===
- Abun-Nasr, Jamil M. (1987). A History of the Maghrib in the Islamic Period. Cambridge University Press. ISBN 978-0-521-33767-0.
- Adam, André (1968). Histoire de Casablanca, des origines à 1914 (in French). Éditions Ophrys.
- Aldrich, Robert (1996). Greater France: A History of French Overseas Expansion. Macmillan Education UK. ISBN 978-0-333-56740-1.
- Best, Antony; Hanhimaki, Jussi; Maiolo, Joseph A.; Schulze, Kirsten E., eds. (2008). International History of the Twentieth Century and Beyond. Routledge. ISBN 978-1-134-07081-7.
- Brown, Kenneth L. (1976). People of Salé: Tradition and Change in a Moroccan City, 1830-1930. Manchester University Press. ISBN 978-0-7190-0623-4.
- Burke, Edmund (1976). Prelude to Protectorate in Morocco: Pre-Colonial Protest and Resistance, 1860-1912. University of Chicago Press. ISBN 978-0-226-08084-0.
- Clark, Christopher M (2013). The Sleepwalkers: How Europe Went to War in 1914. HarperCollins. ISBN 978-0-06-219922-5.
- Dunn, Ross E. (1977). Resistance in the Desert: Moroccan Responses to French Imperialism 1881-1912. Croom Helm. ISBN 978-0-299-07360-2.
- Fay, Sidney Bradshaw (1930). The Origins of the World War. Macmillan.
- Hart, David (1984). The Ait 'Atta of Southern Morocco Daily Life & Recent History. United Kingdom: Middle East & North African Studies Press. ISBN 978-0-906599-15-0.
- Gershovich, Moshe (2012). French Military Rule in Morocco: Colonialism and its Consequences. Routledge. ISBN 978-1-136-32587-8.
- Katan, Yvette (1990). Oujda, une ville frontière du Maroc (1907-1956): Musulmans, Juifs et Chrétiens en milieu colonial (in French). L'Harmattan. ISBN 978-2-7384-0861-7.
- León Rojas, José (2018). Tarifa y las Campañas de Marruecos (1909-1927) (in Spanish). Aljaranda. Archived from the original on 13 August 2020.
- Miller, Susan Gilson (15 April 2013). A History of Modern Morocco. Cambridge University Press. ISBN 978-0-521-81070-8.
- Nelson, Harold D. (1985). Morocco, a country study. Area handbook series. Washington, D.C. : The University.
- Porch, Douglas (1982) The Conquest of Morocco. 2005 edition, New York: Farrar Straus and Giraux. preview
- Ramos Oliver, Francisco (2013). Las guerras de Marruecos (PDF) (in Spanish). Entemu. Archived from the original (PDF) on 27 August 2020.
- Saro Gandarillas, Francisco (1993). "Los orígenes de la Campaña del Rif de 1909". Aldaba (in Spanish) (22): 97–130. doi:10.5944/aldaba.22.1993.20298.
- Trout, Frank E. (1969). Morocco's Saharan Frontiers. Librairie Droz. ISBN 978-2-600-04495-0.

=== Websites ===
- Britannica (2023). "Moroccan crises". Britannica.
