= Antoine Huré =

French army officer and engineer

Antoine Jules Joseph Huré
- Born: 11 February 1873; Corbie, France
- Died: December 1949 (age 76); Saint-Valéry-sur-Somme, France
- Military career
- Allegiance: France
- Branch: French Army
- Rank: Général de Division
- Conflicts: Zaian War; Battle of Aïn Médiouna

General Antoine Jules Joseph Huré (11 February 1873 – December 1949) was a French army officer and engineer noted for his service in Morocco. Huré joined the army as a volunteer in 1893 and after training at the École Polytechnique and École d'Application de l'Artillerie et du Génie he was commissioned into the 3rd Regiment of Engineers. He spent a number of years with his regiment and on staff appointments in France before transferring to Algeria first with the 19th Army Corps, and then the 15th Army Corps. In 1912 Huré transferred to the general staff in eastern Morocco and earned the Colonial Medal.

Huré was recalled to France at the start of the First World War and was shot in the chest whilst serving with the 1st Moroccan Infantry Division, being mentioned in dispatches for continuing with his duties despite his wound. He was posted back to Morocco in 1916 to become military commander of the Fes region. In January 1919 he took over command of French operations against the uprising led by Sidi Mhand n'Ifrutant in the Tafilalt after General Joseph-François Poeymirau was wounded. Huré suppressed the uprising within a month. In April 1919 he led a column to the relief of a French garrison at Aïn Médiouna which had put up a defence against a Moroccan force twenty times their number for four days during another uprising against French rule. Huré then launched further operations that stabilised the military situation in the area within the month. In July he was appointed commander of French troops in Southern Morocco.

Huré eventually reached the rank of général de division and became supreme commander of all French troops in Morocco. Under his supervision the country was finally pacified in 1934. He returned to France in 1935 to serve on the Supreme Council of War and was later made inspector general of engineers. He wrote two books on military history, including one on the pacification of Morocco that was published after his death. Huré was rewarded for his work by appointment as Grand Cross of the Legion of Honour and as Commander of the Order of Ouissam Alaouite.

== Early career ==
Huré was born in Corbie in the Somme department of France on 11 February 1873, the son of Eugene Edouard Edmund Huré and Céline Clémence Marie Burgeat Huré. Huré joined the French Army as a volunteer on 20 October 1893 and became an officer candidate at the École Polytechnique in Paris until 1 October 1895 when he transferred to the École d'Application de l'Artillerie et du Génie (school of Applied Artillery and Engineering) as a sous lieutenant. He received his commission as a second lieutenant on 1 October 1897 and was posted to the 3rd Regiment of Engineers. He was promoted to first lieutenant on 20 November 1898 and captain on 16 March 1901. Huré was married on 11 April 1899 to Josephe Marie Magdaleine Francine, though the marriage was childless. Between 27 April 1901 and 22 August 1904 he was attached to the staff as an engineer at Valenciennes. He rejoined his regiment for two years before attending the École Supérieur de Guerre from 30 October 1906. He was promoted to first captain on 23 June 1907 and joined the staff of the 19th Army Corps in Algiers on 24 October 1908. He transferred to the staff of the 15th Army Corps on 24 December 1910 and on 24 April 1912 to the staff of the military subdivision of Oran.

Huré first arrived in Morocco on 9 October 1912 when he was attached to the general staff in the east of the new French protectorate and received the Colonial Medal for Morocco on 28 April 1914. On 3 August 1914 he became attached to the staff of the 1st Moroccan Infantry Division, being promoted to commandant (major) six days later, and served in the defence of France in the First World War. Huré was wounded in the left breast by a bullet on 28 August 1914 in Faissault and received a mention in dispatches for continuing his duties despite his injury. He was appointed a knight of the Legion of Honour on 28 December 1914, with precedence backdated to the 1 December. Huré became chef de bataillon on 10 January 1916 when he left France to become military commander of the Fes region of Morocco and on 3 January 1918 was appointed an officer of the Legion of Honour, with precedence of 29 December 1917. He was honoured for his service to the country by appointment as a commander of the Moroccan Order of Ouissam Alaouite and on 19 April 1918 he was promoted to lieutenant-colonel.

As a colonel in January 1919 he participated in an operation in the Tafilalt region, under the command of General Joseph-François Poeymirau, to put down an uprising against French rule led by Sidi Mhand n'Ifrutant as part of the Zaian War. After Poeymirau was wounded by the accidental explosion of an artillery shell Huré assumed command and won victories against bands of Moroccans at Zrigat and Erfoud. Huré engaged n'Ifrutant at Tizimi on 25 January, comprehensively defeating his entrenched forces in a six-hour battle and inflicting 600 casualties. Huré received reinforcements from a 10,000 strong irregular tribal force sent by Thami El Glaoui, Pasha of Marrakesh and a French ally, and with their help was able to defeat the n'Ifrutant uprising by 31 January.

== Battle of Aïn Médiouna ==
From 15 February to 5 March 1919 Huré commanded a French column in the area to the north of Boudenib, near the Algerian border, consisting of the 18th battalion of Senegalese Tirailleurs and the 1st battalion Algerian Tirailleurs. Huré's men demolished some ksars belonging to the Aït Aïssa tribe but were scarcely troubled by attack, only his rear guard being fired upon. On 31 March 1919 a French reconnaissance force fighting Abdelmalek bin Muhyi al Din, grandson of the Algerian resistance leader Abdelkader El Djezairi, were threatening the town of Beni Oulid when they detached a unit under Captain Macouillard to take a forward position on the peak of the Gueznaïa hill. The next day, in heavy fog with visibility of only a few metres, Macouillard's force was attacked, in close hand-to-hand fighting his artillerymen are killed at their guns and despite repeated bayonet charges the French position became untenable. A grievously wounded Macouillard handed command to his second, Lieutenant Biron, with orders to take the surviving men back to the fortified French camp at Aïn Médiouna, around 2 kilometres (1.2 mi) distant. Just fifty men made the journey, Biron and the other officers being killed in an ambush set by local villagers who then besieged the French post, assisted by other tribesmen attracted by the sound of gunfire. Attacks on the camp were repulsed by artillery fire directed by Lieutenant Solomon but the French were unable to break the siege. Solomon and Lieutenant Andrew held out against twenty times their number for the next four days, being resupplied with food and water by air, with total casualties (including the fight at Gueznaïa) reaching 4 officers and 292 killed or missing and 67 injured.

Huré led a relief column of 10 infantry companies, seven machine gun sections, 10 cavalry troops, a battery of 75mm artillery and three sections of 65mm mountain guns from Ain Matour to relieve Solomon and Andrew. His men endured forced marches on routes made almost impassable by heavy rain, with one unit covering 62 kilometres (39 mi) in a single day. On the morning of 5 April Huré pushed back the besieging force and made contact with the garrison by 9.00. However the Moroccans counterattacked at 10.00, inflicting casualties of 24 Frenchmen killed and 59 wounded in a close-quarters fight in which they suffered heavy losses.

At 11.00 on 6 April Huré sent out patrols to bury the dead at Gueznaïa, whilst he reinforced the defences at Aïn Médiouna and directed 12 aircraft to bomb the tribesmen remaining in the area. Huré left three companies to garrison Aïn Médiouna before withdrawing the remainder of the men. He and his men were commended for their enthusiasm and spirit which enabled the garrison to be relieved earlier than expected. Huré singled out the French Foreign Legion machine gunners for praise, noting that they had held the enemy off for four hours to cover the retreat of other units. He said "despite your small number ... I knew at once that you would save the situation".

Despite Huré's victory at Aïn Médiouna attacks on loyal villages increased through April 1919 and on the 26th of that month Huré launched another column to defend them. He was attacked at Had Recifa but his hastily fortified camp held and the next morning Huré successfully defeated the tribesmen in battle, at the cost of 12 men killed and 4 officers and 63 men wounded. By the time General Hubert Lyautey and former prime-minister Louis Barthou arrived on an inspection tour on 3 May the military situation had been stabilised thanks to Huré's actions. On 31 July 1919 Huré was appointed to replace Lieutenant-Colonel Mayade in command of French troops in Southern Morocco fighting an uprising led by self-proclaimed Sultan Sembali. Huré later became a général de brigade (brigadier) and commander of the Marrakesh region and was commander of the Legion of Honour on 21 February 1928.

== Pacification of Morocco ==
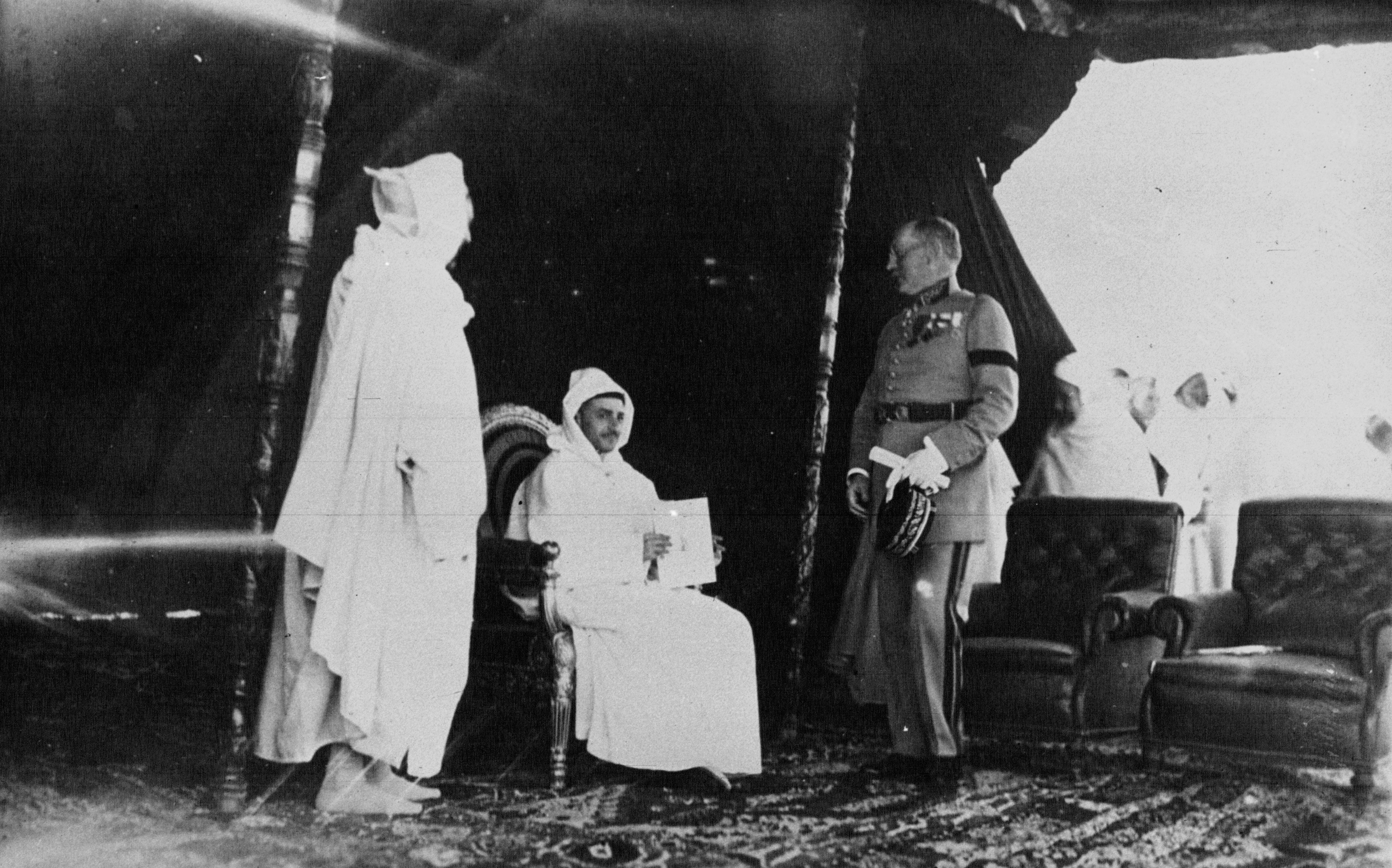
Huré meets with Sultan Mohammed V in Rabat in 1932

Huré became supreme commander of all troops in Morocco in 1931. Upon his appointment the War Minister, André Maginot, warned him that "if you have one unfortunate engagement, I will hide your losses and I will lie against the evidence; but I can only do that once. If you have a second reverse I will be obliged to tell the truth, and then all those – like me – who wish for the pacification of Morocco will be swept away, like Ferry after Lạng Sơn". Referring to the fall of Prime Minister Jules Ferry after the disastrous retreat from Lạng Sơn in Vietnam in 1885. On 16 March 1932 he was promoted to grand-officer of the Legion, having also received promotion to général de division (major-general).

The years of 1933 and 1934 were spent in hard mountain warfare in the last bastions of Moroccan resistance in the High Atlas and Anti-Atlas mountain ranges. Huré himself took personal command of the siege of the 6,000-foot-high (1,800 m) mountain fortress of Bu Gafer in February and March 1933, where he fought alongside General Henri Giraud, in a costly battle that caused the deaths of hundreds of French troops and up to 2,300 Moroccans. In July Huré led another campaign in the Dadès Gorges, laying a new road as he went and utilising his engineering knowledge to procure dozens of truck-powered pneumatic drills for his sappers. By the end of the month this region too was pacified leaving the last pocket of resistance at Mount Baddou, a 10,000-foot-high (3,000 m) peak home to 2,000-3,000 Berber tribesmen. Huré again led directly, commanding a two-week complete siege that successfully forced the tribesmen and their families to surrender, they were treated well and given food and supplies and allowed to return to their homes. There were further minor skirmishes in the Anti-Atlas in the winter of 1933/4 but by March 1934 Huré had pacified the remainder of the country and brought to an end almost 30 years of continuous French military involvement in Morocco.

== Return to France ==
Huré returned to France to serve on the Supreme Council of War in 1935 and also sat on Louis Franchet d'Espèrey's African Friendship Committee, an organisation established to encourage the loyalty of North Africa to France in case of war. By 1936 he was inspector general of French North African troops and in 1938 was appointed inspector general of engineers. He was appointed grand cross of the Legion of Honour on 8 July 1938 and in the same year co-wrote Lyautey du Tonkin au Maroc par Madagascar et le Sud-Oranais (Lyautey in Tonkin and Morocco by way of Madagascar and South Oran [Algeria]) with British historian Sonia E. Howe. Huré was president of the Islam study group of the Politique étrangère journal for 1939. After the outbreak of the Second World War Huré became Inspector General of the Military Regions of France on 5 June 1940, holding that position until 1 July by which point France had surrendered to the Germans.

Huré died in December 1949 at Saint-Valéry-sur-Somme in France. In 1952 a book he had written, La Pacification du Maroc. Dernière étape : 1931–1934 (The Pacification of Morocco. The Last Step: 1931–1934), was published with a preface written by Marshal Alphonse Juin.
