= 1912 Fez riots =

Anti-colonial insurrection in Morocco

- Part of French conquest of Morocco
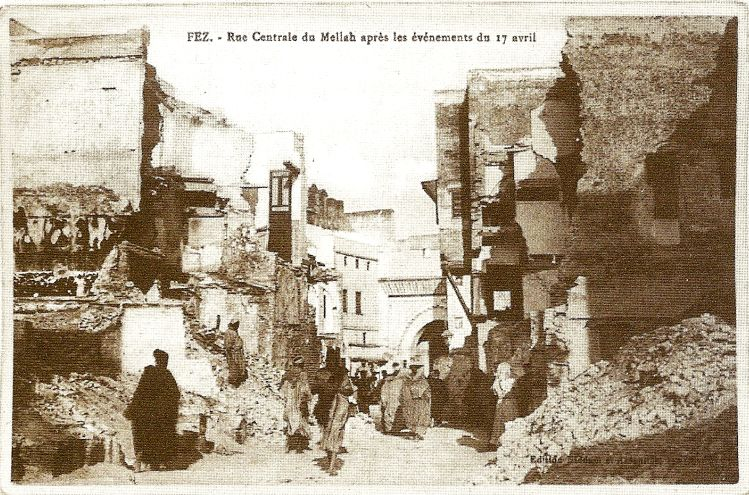
- Damage to the Mellah after French artillery fire in the Intifada of Fes
- Date: 17 April 1912
- Location: Fez, Morocco; 34°2′36″N 5°0′12″W
- Caused by: Treaty of Fes
- Methods: Mutiny, riot
- Result: French suppression

Casualties
- Deaths: 600 Moroccan Muslims, 66 Europeans, 42 Moroccan Jews
- Location within Morocco

The Fes Riots, also known as the Fes Uprising or Mutiny (from Arabic: انتفاضة فاس, Intifadat Fes), the Tritl (Hebrew: התריתל, among the Jewish community) and the Bloody Days of Fes (from French: Les Journées Sanglantes de Fès) were riots which started on April 17, 1912, in Fes, the then-capital of Morocco, when French officers announced the measures of the Treaty of Fes, which created the French protectorate in Morocco.

The riots broke out shortly after the population of Fes learnt about the treaty, which they generally viewed as a betrayal by Sultan Abd al-Hafid, who had left Fes for Rabat to ensure his safety. After the riots, he was forced to abdicate in favour of his brother Yusuf.

Despite warnings of an uprising, most French troops left Fes, leaving behind 1,500 French troops and 5,000 Moroccan askars (local colonial infantrymen) commanded by French officers. On the morning of 17 April, the French officers announced the new measures to their askars. Many units immediately mutinied, causing a total loss of control.

According to the report on the front page of Le Matin on April 19, 1912, the riots broke out in Fes at about 11:00 am Wednesday morning, April 17, 1912. The rebels killed three wireless telegraphy workers and injured a fourth to cut connections with the outside world. The sultan, Abdulhafid, was besieged by rebels at his palace.

The soldiers attacked their French commanders, then left their barracks and attacked the European and Jewish quarters of the city. According to the Moroccan historian Mohammed Kenbib, "the French commander, General Brulard, thinking that the Jews were supporting the insurgents, ordered his artillery to shell the mallāḥ, causing great devastation, and wounding and killing many people, both Jews and Muslims." The rebels surrendered after two days. The death toll included approximately 600 Moroccan Muslims, 66 Europeans, and 42 Moroccan Jews.

The first account of the riot was written by Hubert Jacques, a journalist at Le Matin, and a personal friend of Hubert Lyautey. The report was strongly critical of Eugène Regnault. The same newspaper listed both Regnault and Lyautey among four candidates likely to be considered for the position of France's resident-general in Morocco.

After the violence, Resident General Hubert Lyautey decided to make Rabat the capital instead of Fes. Resistance to the French continued in May, with the Siege of Fez (1912).

== Bibliography ==
- Jacques, Hubert (1913), Les journées sanglantes de Fez, 17-18-19 avril 1912: les massacres; récits militaires; responsabilités, Libraririe Chapelot
- Burke III, Edmund (15 February 2009), "The Fez Mutiny and the Revolt of El Hiba", Prelude to Protectorate in Morocco: Pre-Colonial Protest and Resistance, 1860-1912, University of Chicago Press, 2009, ISBN 9780226080840
- Gershovich, Moshe (2000). "Pre-Colonial Morocco: Demise of the Old Makhzan". French Military Rule in Morocco: colonialism and its consequences. Routledge. ISBN 0-7146-4949-X.
