= Treaty Between France and Spain Regarding Morocco =

1912 treaty dividing Morocco into Spanish and French protectorates

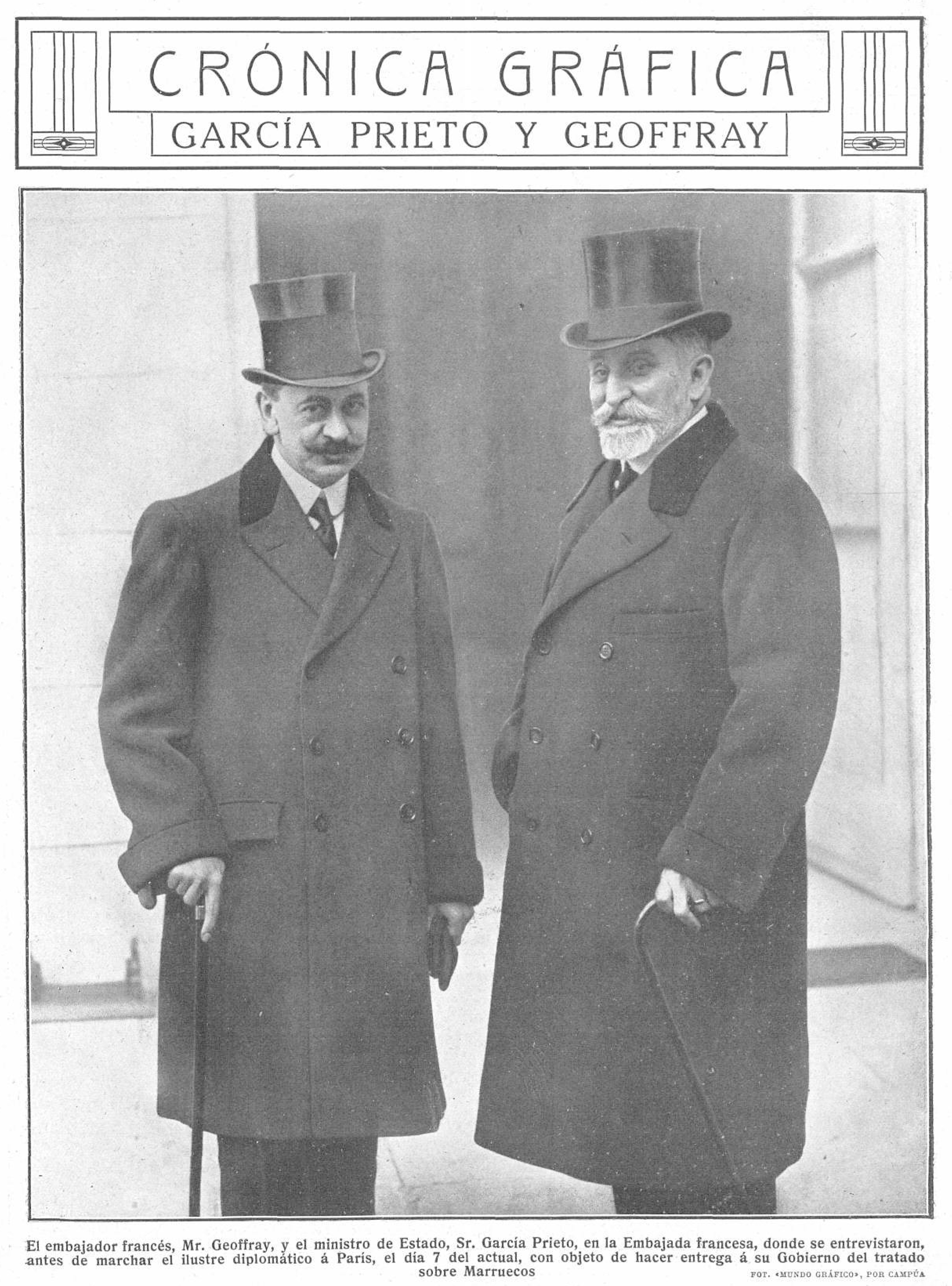
- Spanish Minister of State García Prieto and French ambassador Léon Geoffray.
- Context: French conquest of Morocco
- Signed: 27 November 1912
- Location: Madrid, Spain
- Parties: Spain; France
- Languages: Spanish; French

Spanish Morocco in pink (northern zone and Cape Juby), French Morocco in light green, Spain and colonies in red, French colonies in dark green.

The Treaty between France and Spain regarding Morocco was signed on 27 November 1912 by French and Spanish heads of state, establishing de jure a Spanish Zone of influence in northern and southern Morocco, both zones being de facto under Spanish control, while France was still regarded as the protecting power as it was the sole occupying power to sign the Treaty of Fes.

The northern part was to become the zone of the Spanish protectorate in Morocco with its capital in Tetuan, while the southern part, known as Cape Juby, was ruled from El Aiun as a buffer zone between the Spanish Colony of Rio de Oro and French Morocco.

== Signing ==
The treaty was signed by the Spanish Minister of State García Prieto and the French ambassador Léon Geoffray at the Santa Cruz Palace in Madrid on November 27, 1912. Artilicle 7 says "The city of Tangier and its outskirts will be provided with a special government, which will be determined hereafter; they will form a zone included within the following described limits: Starting from Punta Altares on the southern coast of the Straits of Gibraltar, the boundary will extend in a straight line along the crest of Jebel Beni Meyimel, keeping the village called Dzar-ez-Zeitun on the west, and will then follow the boundary line between the Fahs on the one side and the tribes of Anj era and of Wed Ras on the other side, to its juncture with the river Es Seghir. Thence, the boundary will follow the channel of the river Es Seghir, then the channels of the rivers M'harhar and Tzahadartz to the sea." . This led to the International Zone of Tangier.
