= Siege of Fez (1912) =

Moroccan rebels v. France, French victory

- Part of French conquest of Morocco
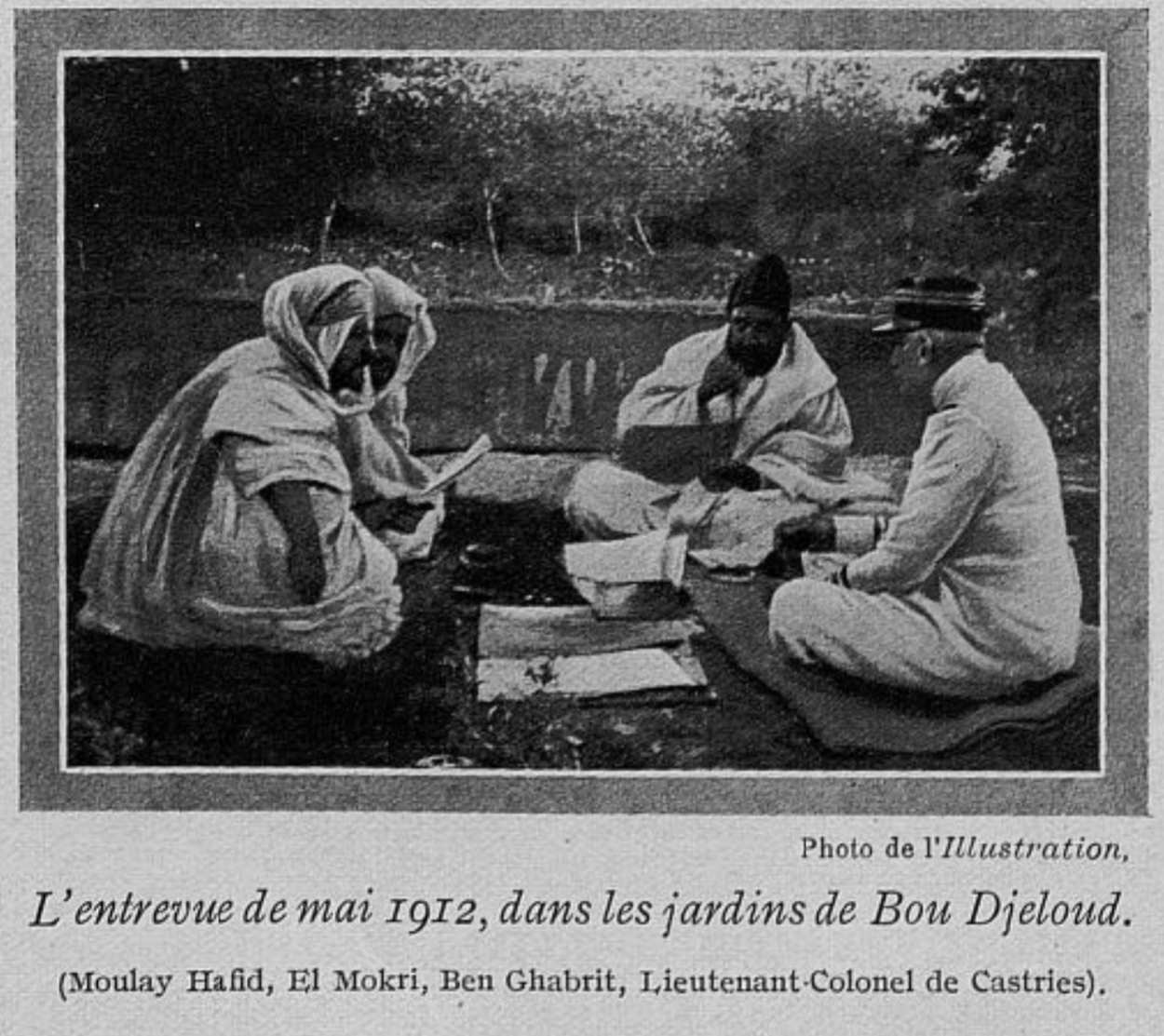
- The interview in the gardens of Bab Bou Jeloud, between Sultan Abd al-Hafid, Lieutenant-Colonel de Castries, Benghabrit and al-Muqri.
Date	25 May – 2 June 1912
Location	Fez, Morocco 34.033333°N 5.000000°W
Result	French victory: Infiltration and pillaging of the medina by tribes; Initial advantage for the Mujahideen at the beginning of the conflict; Tribal setback at the Battle of el-Hajera al-Kohela, ending the siege

Belligerents
Troops of al-Hijami: Hyayna; Ghiata; Tsoul; Branes; Lemta; Beni Sadden; Jeblis; Bani Zeroual; El-Jaya; Cheraga; Cherarda; Oulad al-Hajj; Fichtala Troops of Moulay Ahmed ben Hassan al-Sba’i: Aït Youssi of Sefrou; Tariqa Darqawiyah Troops of Sidi Raho ·: Aït Seghrouchen of Imouzzer Kandar; Aït Youssi; Beni Mtir; Aït M'Guild	France; Makhzen

Commanders and leaders
Sherif Muhammad al-Hijami; Sidi Raho; Moulay Ahmed ben Hassan al-Sba’i al-Madani as-Soussi ("the Fake Bouhamara"); Mohamed ben Hassan as-Semlali ’Aqa al-Bouidmani; Si Brahim ben Mohamed al-Barnoussi; Ahmed ben Bachir al-Bou’alayi al-Barnoussi; Houcine ben Massoud al-Aliyani al-Hayyani; El-Mizziani (?)	(France) Henri Gouraud (France) Hubert Lyautey (France) André-Gaston Prételat (France) Lieutenant Mas † (France) Lieutenant Louat (France) Lieutenant de la Guillonière (France) General Meunier (France) Colonel Maziller (France) Lieutenant Chardonnay †; Moulay Abdelhafidh; Mohamed el-Mekki al-Ouazani; Caïd Ould Ba Mohamed; Caïd Mia Si Brahim ben al-Hajj Abdullah al-Hihi (WIA)

Strength
Between 3,000 and 10,000 (up to 20,000) tribal mujahideen	(France) Around 15,000 French troops * 1 Foreign Legion battalion * 1 Senegalese Tirailleurs unit (4th Senegalese Tirailleurs Battalion) * 1 Algerian Tirailleurs unit * 1 Tunisian Tirailleurs unit * 3 infantry battalions * 3 Spahi platoons * 1 engineer detachment Goumiers and Cherifian forces: * 3 infantry battalions * 3 Cherifian cavalry platoons

Casualties and losses
Relatively heavy	

The Siege of Fez was a military operation carried out by Moroccan resistance fighters under the leadership of Sherif Muhammad al-Hijami and Sidi Raho between 25 May and 2 June 1912, against the city of Fez and occupying French troops, in reaction to the Treaty of Fez. The operation consisted of a blockade of the city along with occasional direct offensives within the city walls.

== Background ==
Morocco was in the midst of a French invasion, notably marked by significant conflicts such as the Chaouia campaign. Events accelerated in the Fez region around 30 March 1912, when Sultan Moulay Abd al-Hafidh signed the Treaty of Fez, establishing Morocco as a French protectorate. Regarding this as "selling the country to the Christians," the inhabitants of Fez revolted during the Fez Bloody Days.

Meanwhile, religious leaders within the surrounding tribes called for a holy war (jihad) against the occupiers and the government, which they accused of betraying the nation to "infidels." Among these leaders was Sherif Muhammad al-Hijami, a highly influential sharif from the al-Jaïa tribe among the tribes north of Fez.

Sharif al-Hijami traveled through various tribal areas to gather support for the jihad. He primarily rallied the Hyayna, Ghiata, Tsoul, Branes, Bani Warain, and Aït Sadden tribes, as well as the Jbala, Cheraga, Oulad al-Hajj, Cherarda, and Beni Zeroual. Concurrently, his counterpart, Sharif Sidi Raho, took charge of mobilizing the powerful tribes of the Middle Atlas, including the Beni Mtir, Aït M'Guild, Aït Youssi, and Aït Seghrouchen.

== Course of the conflict ==
=== Initial movements ===
On 16 May, after rallying the regional tribes, al-Hijami's forces assembled at Ain Boumerched in the Lemta region north of Fez. He was accompanied by 3,000 cavalry and 600 infantrymen, drawn mostly from the Branes, Tsoul, Ghiata, Hyayna, and Beni Warain.

=== 25 May 1912 ===
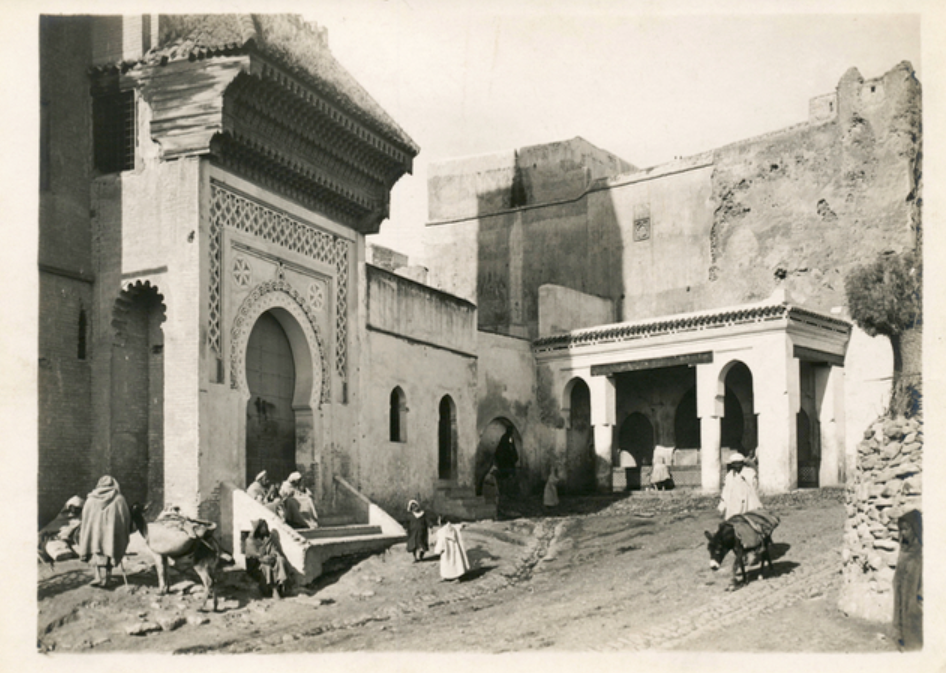
Bab Guissa in 1920.

During the night between 24 and 25 May, gunfire erupted north of the city, marking the beginning of the siege. That morning, an assault was launched against Bab Guissa, but it was repelled by French tirailleurs. By 22:00, intense firing resumed, followed by artillery half an hour later.

The anti-Makhzen tribes controlled half of the city's periphery—the northeast and the east towards the Sebou River—and penetrated as far as the Zawiya of Moulay Idriss II under al-Hijami's leadership. There, resistance fighters scaled the tomb of Idris II and secured a banner, which the sharif used throughout his subsequent battles. Fighting shifted into the narrow streets of the city, where the guarding tirailleurs at Bab Guissa were caught in the crossfire and killed by the insurgents. A faction of the tribals encountered Colonel Mazillier, who was stationed at Bab Debibagh, though details of this engagement remain unrecorded; the insurgents subsequently withdrew to avoid being cut off from their main camp.

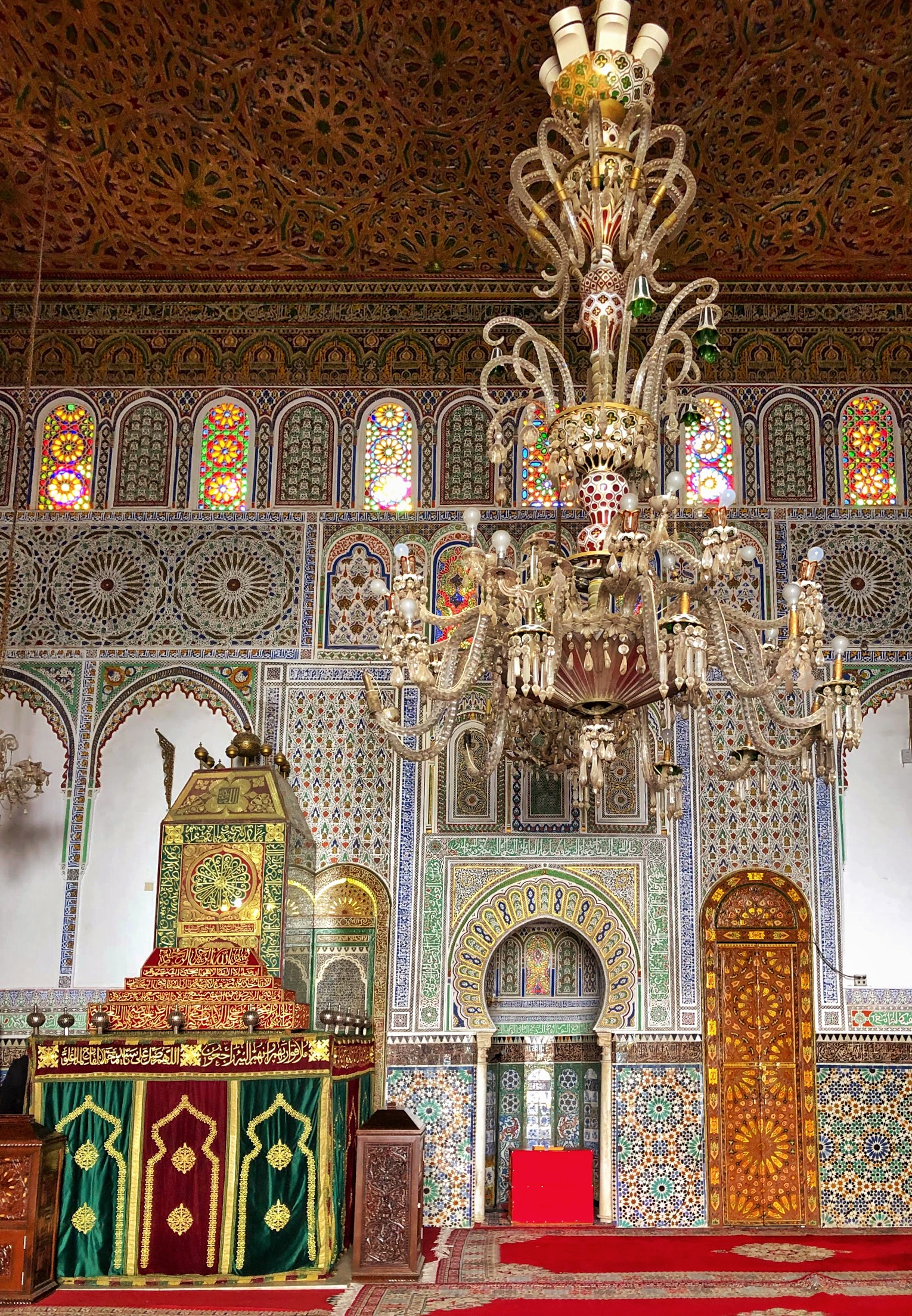
Mausoleum of Idris II.

At Bab Guissa and its adjoining mosque, the mujahideen successfully used ropes and grappling hooks to scale the walls during the night. They inflicted heavy casualties on the two regiments of the 4th Tirailleurs Division defending the gate; their commanding officer, Lieutenant Chardonnay, was mortally wounded during the attack.

=== 26 May ===
Early in the day, Resident-General Hubert Lyautey congratulated the Feller battalion for defending the positions at Dar ben Amar throughout the night. Following a tactical disagreement between Lyautey and Gouraud, in which Gouraud's view prevailed, the future Marshal granted Gouraud command over all positions in Fes el Bali.

Gouraud immediately inspected the front lines, particularly Bab Guissa, where he climbed the minaret with a lookout. From there, he spotted around a hundred mujahideen near the Borj Nord and the Marinid Tombs firing in all directions, with bullet impacts chipping plaster off the minaret, one nearly striking the future general in the eye. The positioned mujahideen were using pickaxes to dig holes into the city walls. Upon hearing this, Gouraud positioned men with fixed bayonets directly behind the walls, ready to ambush the diggers. He then proceeded to inspect the positions at Sidi Boujida, Tamdert, and Bab Ftouh.

=== 27 to 30 May ===
Further combat occurred throughout these days, described as "even more ferocious" by Moroccan historians. However, few specific operational details survive, as these dates were largely overshadowed by the pivotal Battle of Hajera al-Kohila on 1 June.

==== 28 May ====
Around 15:00, a massive assembly of tribal fighters gathered on the Zelagh ridge. Small groups detached themselves to pour down the valleys toward the city. Archers stationed at Borj Nord and machine-gun batteries at the Marinid Tombs engaged them, but with limited success. The crowd remained until 17:00; once the Zelagh was cleared, the tribal forces shifted into the gardens east of the city.

Shortly after, renewed attacks were launched against Bab Ftouh, Bab Guissa, and Borj Nord. The French, having improved their organization since the initial assault, successfully held the northern and southern fronts. At 18:00, however, mujahideen on the eastern front breached an entry point along the Oued Fez and successfully infiltrated the heart of the city.

The situation was deemed critical by French command. Lyautey entrusted the defense of the city ramparts to Generals Moignier and Brullard, while assigning inner city security to Gouraud. Gouraud established a cordon of soldiers through the alleys still under French control to contain the attackers or force a retreat. He also ordered all sensitive materials and assets to be gathered in the main courtyard, placing petrol cans nearby to incinerate them if the positions were overrun. Night fell amidst widespread chaos and uncertainty regarding the survival of the French garrison.

=== 29 May ===
In the morning, the city was calm as the tribal forces had retreated into the Zelagh and Inaouen valleys. Certain parts of the city, particularly Bab Guissa, resembled a cemetery, piled with the bodies of fallen mujahideen. Sultan Abd al-Hafidh offered breakfast to the general and his staff. Occasional, isolated gunshots still echoed through the city. The Sultan then held a meeting with the general, and subsequently visited the wounded French soldiers.

=== 30 May ===
With the situation remaining critical, Gouraud received orders to assemble all available troops to form the "Gouraud Column". This force consisted of the Dresch Battalion, the Duhalde Mixed Battalion (colonial troops and Senegalese tirailleurs), the Rivière Mixed Battalion (similarly composed), the Giralte Battalion (Legionnaires and tirailleurs), a battery of 75mm guns, two sections of 75mm guns, a mountain section of 75mm guns, and all available cavalry. They were organized and prepared to directly confront the mujahideen forces.

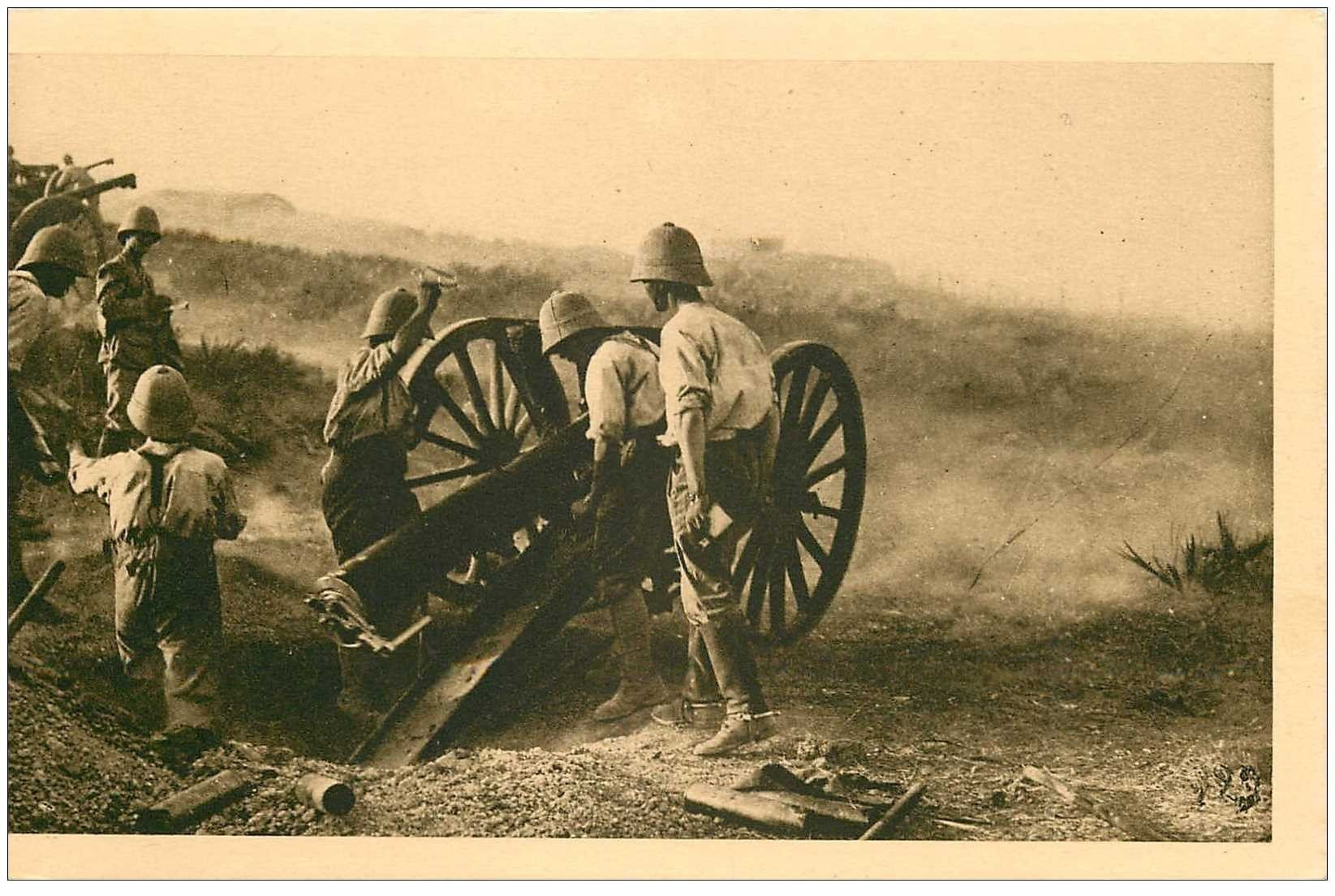
A 75mm artillery battery in Morocco.

Meanwhile, although the northern and western fronts had been abandoned by the attackers, the telephone lines along the road to Meknes remained cut and acts of violence continued. Notably, French mail couriers were found hanged from trees or impaled, and the residents of Fez (Ahl Fès) complained of severe food and supply shortages.

Al-Hijami's forces established their positions on Mount Zelagh, stretching from Sidi Ahmed el-Barnoussi through the Sebou valley to Hajira al-Kohila, where Sharif al-Hijami set up his headquarters. To the southeast of Fez, Sidi Raho's troops were deployed, notably behind Ben Jelliq. Additionally, bands of horsemen roamed the Saïss plains, looting farms, attacking caravans, and killing French guards. The Moroccan goumier garrisons at Sefrou and El Hajeb remained loyal to the French but faced constant attacks from the mujahideen. General Moignier managed to restore order among the Muslim population within Fez, keeping the interior of the city peaceful, but the outskirts remained chaotic. Tribal leaders, galvanized by the call to jihad, stood ready with their clans to turn against the city once more.

=== 1 June: Battle of Hajera al-Kohila ===
At 04:00, the entirety of the Gouraud Column assembled at Bab Ftouh, prepared to exit the city walls. Moving out through Bab Boujida, the forces launched an offensive toward the flank of Mount Zelagh—a sudden tactical move by the future general aimed at catching the enemy by surprise. By 05:00, the vanguard, consisting of four Spahi platoons, one Cherifian platoon, the Duhalde Battalion, and a battery of 75mm guns, advanced toward the Sebou bridge. Along their path, the stench of decaying Moroccan corpses was intense, worsened by the heat. They then began their ascent of Mount Zelagh. At 05:45, the Senegalese company of the vanguard came under fire from the mountain ridges. They deployed and retaliated with the support of a 75mm artillery section.

Between 06:00 and 06:30, the Giralte and Rivière battalions entered the fray under the command of Colonel Mazillier, who was on the front lines as they crossed the "Ben Tato" bridge over the Bou Khrareb river. The mujahideen fired from a first ridge, and then a second, prompting French troops to launch an assault to clear the left flank.

At 08:00, Gouraud's column set up its artillery batteries. From his vantage point, Gouraud observed roughly thirty groups of about 300 to 400 men each—both cavalry and infantry, preceded by their standards—advancing from the Sebou valley. They moved forward with complete confidence, heavily galvanized. It was at this moment that the decisive battle determining the fate of the protectorate began. Gouraud, identifiable by his red pennant, became a central target.

The advancing harka of mujahideen picked up their pace at a distance of 2,000 meters, chanting war songs. French artillery opened fire on the troops coming from the Sebou; under the bombardment, the mujahideen dispersed, some taking cover in the brush along the river, others making for the summits and reverse slopes of the Zelagh. However, a large number stoically continued their direct advance toward the French lines. The French then launched a counter-assault, advancing in successive bounds under the cover of their artillery. Two ridges were successfully captured by Gouraud's men. The French deployment eventually extended across four kilometers from the Zelagh to the Sebou, nearly surrounding hundreds of Moroccans who were subsequently driven back in bayonet fighting. Intense combat persisted on the final ridges protecting al-Hijami's camp, leaving several French officers severely wounded.

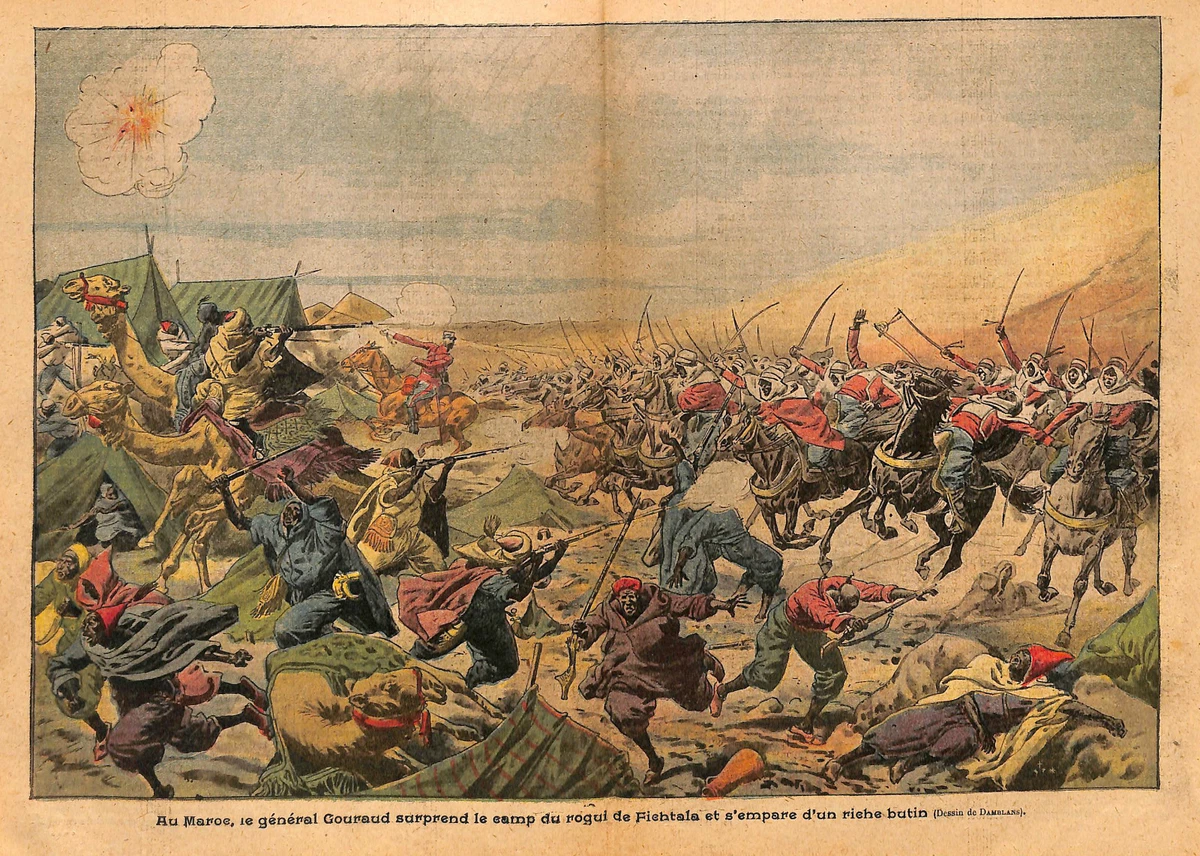
"General Gouraud surprises the camp of the Rogui of the Fichtala [Rogui Semlali]", 1912.

Around 10:00, the main ridge was occupied by the French. A prominent leader, a sharif, holding a silver banner, attempted to rally the retreating tribal forces, but his group was dispersed by targeted artillery fire. Catching sight of al-Hijami's outpost at Hajira al-Kohila four kilometers away, Gouraud's cavalry charged forward. Other fighters belonging to al-Hijami attempted to check the French advance, but they too were driven back by artillery. By 11:30, the camp was captured, completely abandoned. By 14:00, French troops continued their push eastward as far as Sidi Chafaï.

Fez was officially relieved, bringing an end to a brief but extremely intense six-day siege.

== Aftermath ==
The defeat at Hajera al-Kohila allowed the French to capture al-Hijami's operational attack plans. These documents revealed high-level strategic planning; Gouraud discovered an extremely detailed plan that, in theory, would have been highly effective. Each tribe had been assigned specific attack zones, with participating clans drawn from across multiple regions, including the Rif, the Middle Atlas, Meknes, and Taza.

This victory paved the way for Gouraud's promotion to general as a result of this exploit, making him the youngest general in the French army at the time, aged 45. It also enabled the pacification of the region north of Fez, opening a new northern front against the Beni Sadden, Hyayna, Ghiata, Tsoul, and Branes tribes.

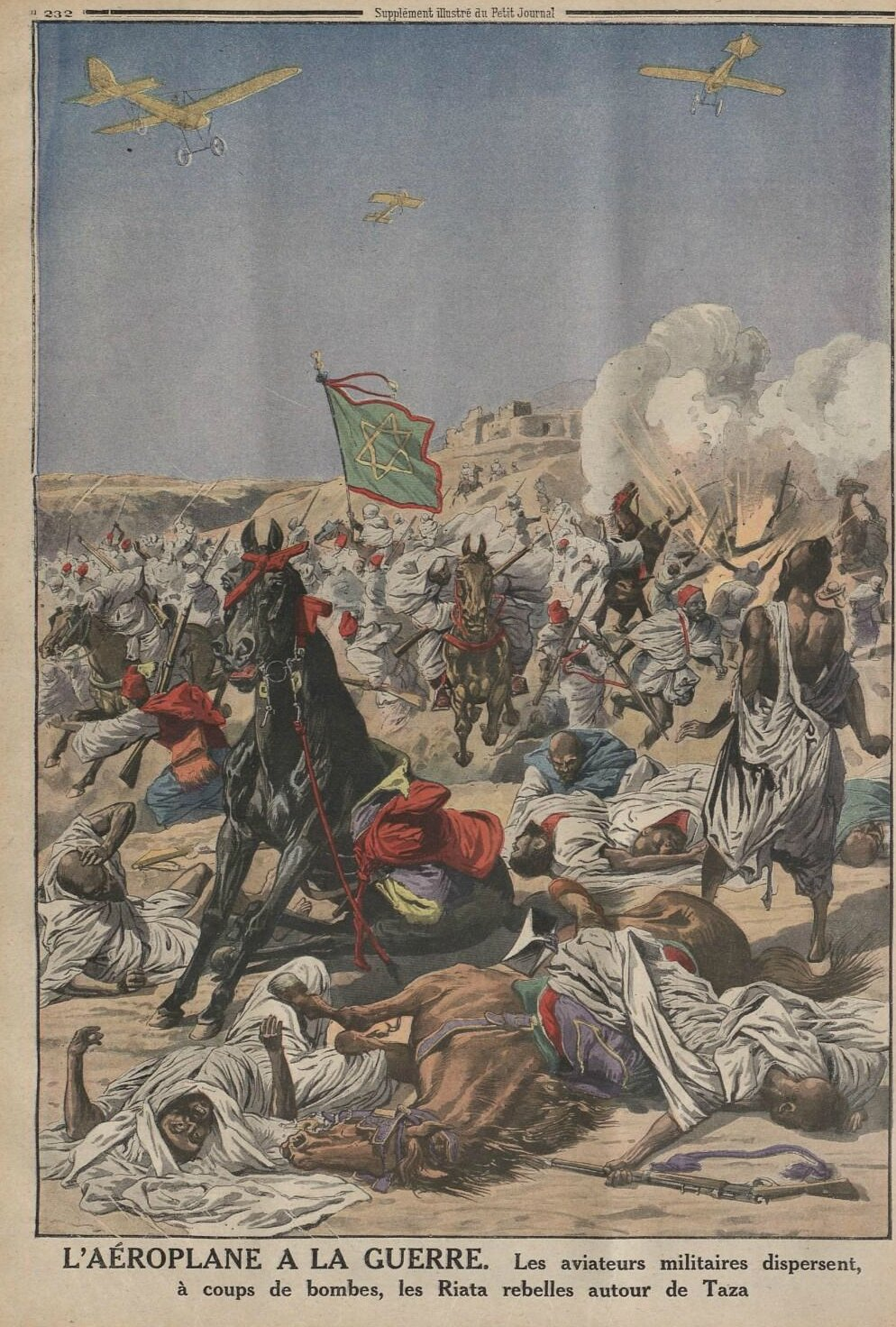
The French campaign against the Ghiata, emerging from this northern front, as depicted in Le Petit Journal on 1 January 1914.

The following day, Gouraud made a victorious entry into Fez. His troops paraded through the medina, where they were reviewed by Lyautey, Moignier, and Regnault. Sultan Abd al-Hafidh attended the parade, thanking the troops for "saving his empire" and presenting an official sword as a reward.

A commemorative plaque was later installed at Dar al-Menebhi, a palace that had belonged to the Minister of War el-Menebhi. Marshal Lyautey had been stationed there during the siege, and General Charles Noguès visited the site in 1936.
