= Ain Mediouna =

Ain Mediouna عين مديونة
- Town
- Location within Morocco
- Coordinates: 34°30′N 4°33′W
- Country: Morocco
- Region: Taza-Al Hoceima-Taounate
- Province: Taounate Province

Population (2004)
  - Total: 16,410
- Time zone: UTC+0 (GMT)

Ain Mediouna is a town in Taounate Province, Taza-Al Hoceima-Taounate, Morocco. According to the 2004 census it has a population of 16,410.
