= Léon Geoffray =

French diplomat (1852–1927)

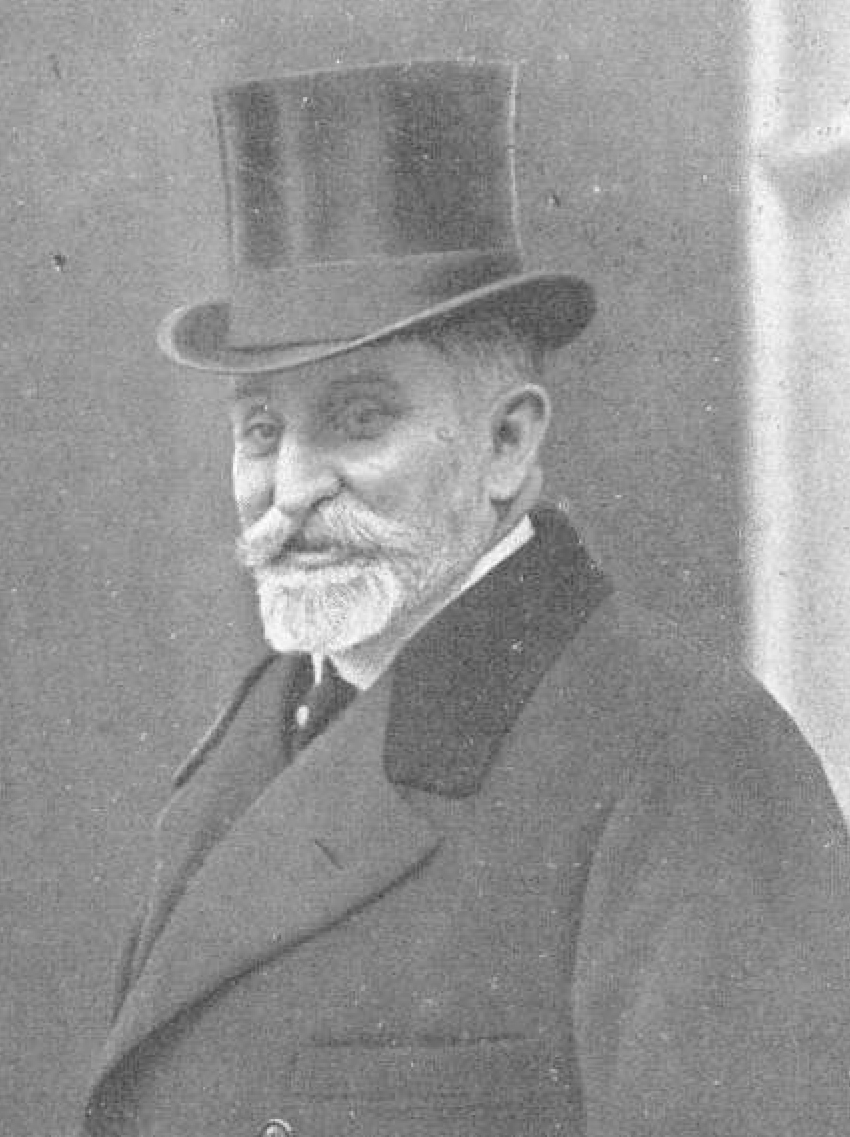
- Léon Geoffray in 1912

Ambassador of France to Spain
- In office 1910–1917

Minister Plenipotentiary to the United Kingdom
- In office 1902–1908

Personal details
- Born: October 1, 1852 Passy, France
- Died: December 25, 1927 (aged 75) Paris, France
- Occupation: Diplomat
- Awards: Grand Cross of the Legion of Honour; Grand Cross of the Order of Charles III

Léon Marcel Isidore Geoffray (1852–1927) was a French diplomat and was later Ambassador to Madrid.

== Biography ==
Léon Marcel Geoffray Isidore was born in Passy on 1 October 1852 to Pierre-Joseph Geoffray (1804-1886), and Juliette (called Julie) Wild Josephine de La Martinière.

Léon and his brother Marcel were educated in Passy by their mother, and a tutor. Leon Geoffray studied law at the Faculte de Droit in Paris, by the age of twenty five he had obtained a degree of Doctor of Law, before entering the diplomatic service.

He was at first attached to the legal department of the Ministry of Foreign Affairs in 1877, then to the embassy in Constantinople from 1877 to 1879, and back to the legal department at the Ministry of Foreign Affairs (1879). He rose through the ranks: senior clerk (1883); editor (1886); Secretary of the Embassy (1891).

Geoffray was appointed Senior Advisor to the embassy in London in 1895, with the rank of first class secretary, and minister plenipotentiary in 1896. He became passionately committed to healing Anglo-French relations and desired to achieve an alliance between England and France. He continued to work on maintaining Anglo-French relations up to his departure from London in 1908.

Geoffray was Consul General in Cairo from 1908 to 1910, and in July 1910 Ambassador of France to Madrid, remaining in Spain until dismissed in October 1917.

On 27 November 1912, he and Spanish Minister of State García Prieto signed the Treaty between France and Spain regarding Morocco, which established de jure Spanish zones of influence in northern and southern Morocco, both zones already under de facto Spanish control, while France remained the primary colonial power as the sole non-Moroccan state signatory of the 1912 Treaty of Fes.

Leon Geoffray died in Paris on 25 December 1927.

== Personal ==
He was the owner of the castle of Vaulx (17th century) in Saint-Julien-de-Civry, Saône-et-Loire, and instructed the landscaper Achille Duchêne to develop the park in 1900. He married Louise Marcotte Quivières, with whom he had two sons, Pierre Geoffray (1884-1975) and Edme Geoffray (1886-1926).

== Honours ==
King Alfonso XIII granted him the Collar of the Order of Charles III. and Edward VII created him an honorary Knight Grand Cross of the Royal Victorian Order.
