= Joseph-François Poeymirau =

French general (1869–1924)

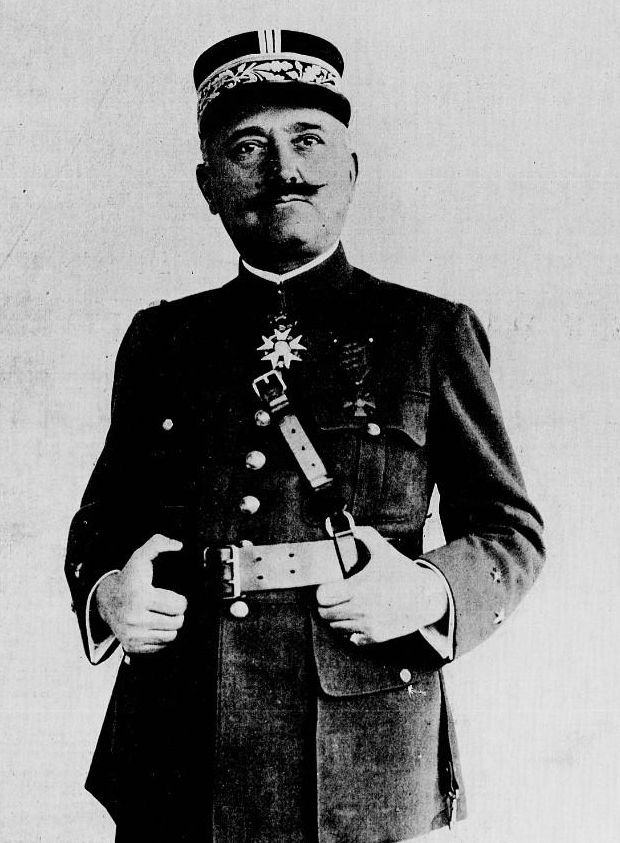
Joseph-François Poeymirau (1919)

Joseph-François Poeymirau (8 November 1869 – 22 February 1924) was a French general.

== Childhood ==
Poeymirau was born in Pau, Pyrénées-Atlantiques on 8 November 1869 and was the son of André Adolphe Poeymirau, a businessman, and his wife Delphine Rocaché. He studied at the Collège Stanislas de Paris, then the Military School of Saint-Cyr Coetquidan before being accepted to the War College.

== French conquest of Morocco ==
Poeymirau commanded 30,000 men and reported initial success in his 1920 expeditions.
