= Marshan Palace =

Moroccan royal palace

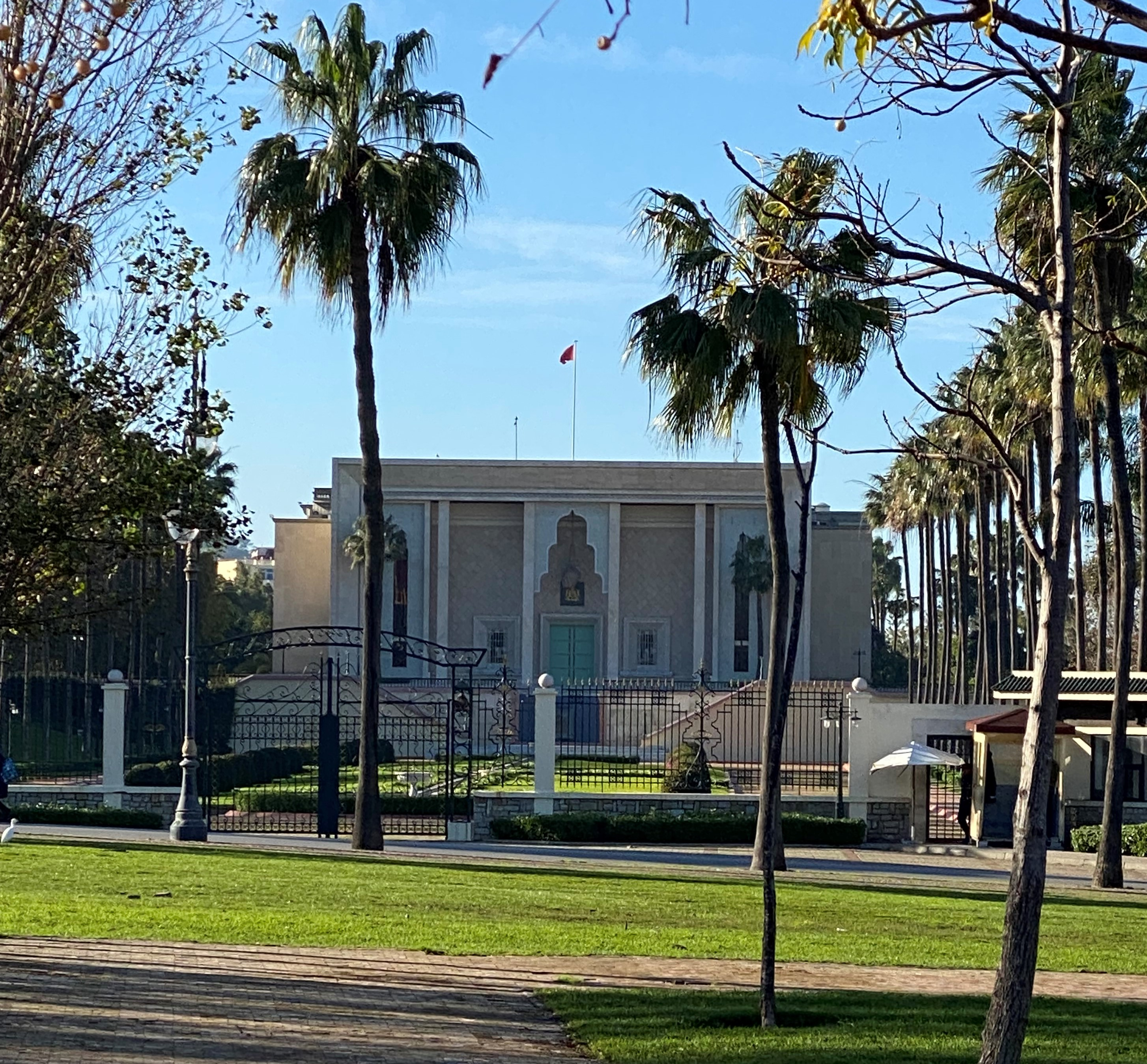
Marshan Palace viewed from the nearby Stade de Marchan

The Marshan Palace is a palace of the King of Morocco in the Marshan neighborhood of Tangier, Morocco.

== Legislative Assembly of the Tangier International Zone ==
The building was initially erected in the early 1950s as the seat of the Legislative Assembly of the Tangier International Zone.

== Maison de Tanger ==
Following the independence of Morocco in 1956 and its proclamation as a kingdom on 14 August 1957, the building was repurposed as a property of the Monarchy. In the early years following independence, it was known as the Maison de Tanger ("House of Tangier").

From 27 to 30 April 1958, it was the venue of the Tangier Conference, a gathering of representatives from newly independent Morocco and Tunisia and from the Algerian National Liberation Front (FLN), which promoted a vision for a future united North Africa that unraveled in the subsequent years. Participants in the Tangier Conference included Ferhat Abbas, Abdelhafid Boussouf, and Abdelhamid Mehri from the FLN; Bahi Ladgham, Ahmed Tlili, and Abdelhamid Chaker from the Tunisian Neo Destour party; and Allal al-Fassi, Ahmed Balafrej, Abderrahim Bouabid, and Mehdi Ben Barka from the Moroccan Istiqlal Party. The conference was chaired by Allal al-Fassi.

== Royal palace ==
In the 2010s, King Mohammed VI had the palace revamped to make it into a venue for diplomatic events. On 20 September 2015, Mohammed VI and French President François Hollande made there a communication dubbed the "Tangier Call" (French: Appel de Tanger) about the need to fight climate change.

Across the street from the Marshan Palace lies the Mendoub's Residence, the former mansion of the Mendoub (representative of the Sultan of Morocco in Tangier) that later hosted the Forbes Museum of Tangier from 1970 to 1990.

== See also ==
- Stade de Marchan, in front of the Marshan Palace
- Kasbah Palace, Tangier
- Mendoubia
- List of Moroccan royal residences
