= Sidi Bou Abid Mosque =

Mosque in Tangier, Morocco

- مسجد سيدي بو عبيد
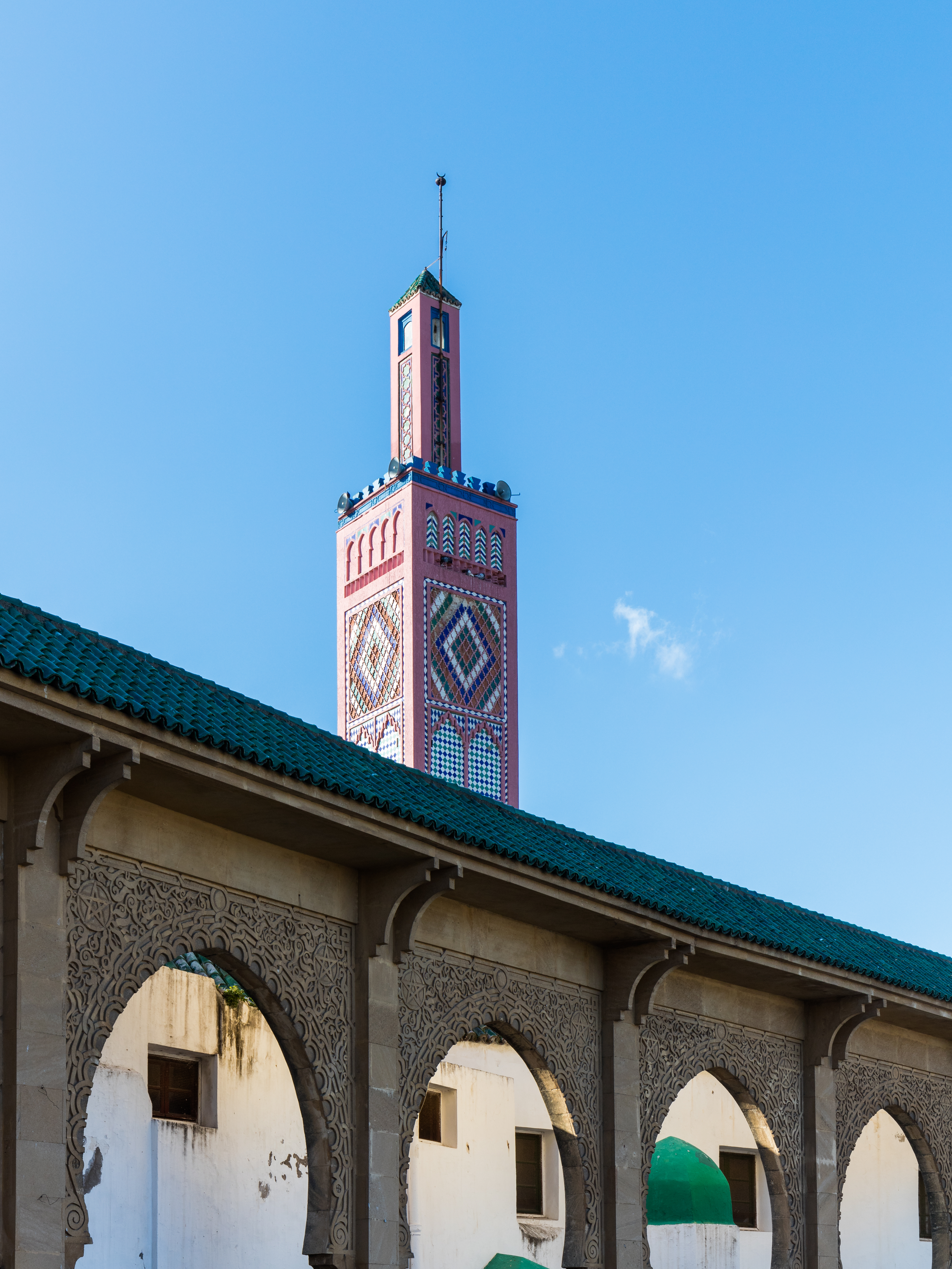

Religion
- Affiliation: Islam

Location
- Location: Tangier, Morocco
- Interactive map of Sidi Bou Abid Mosque

Architecture
- Type: mosque

Sidi Bou Abid Mosque (Arabic: مسجد سيدي بو عبيد) is a mosque overlooking the Grand Socco medina area of central Tangier, Morocco from the southwest. It was built in 1917 and is decorated in polychrome tiles. Near Bab Fahs, the Mendoubia Gardens are a double gateway leading into the medina.

Sidi Bou Abid Mosque on a cloudy day

Main entrance of the mosque

== See also ==
- Mohammed V Mosque, Tangier
- Lalla Abla Mosque
- List of mosques in Morocco
