= Tangier International Zone =

1925–1956 international condominium

Coordinates: 35°46′N 5°48′W

Tangier International Zone منطقة طنجة الدولية (Arabic) Zone internationale de Tanger (French) Zona Internacional de Tánger (Spanish)
- 1925–1940; 1945–1956
- Flag Coat of arms

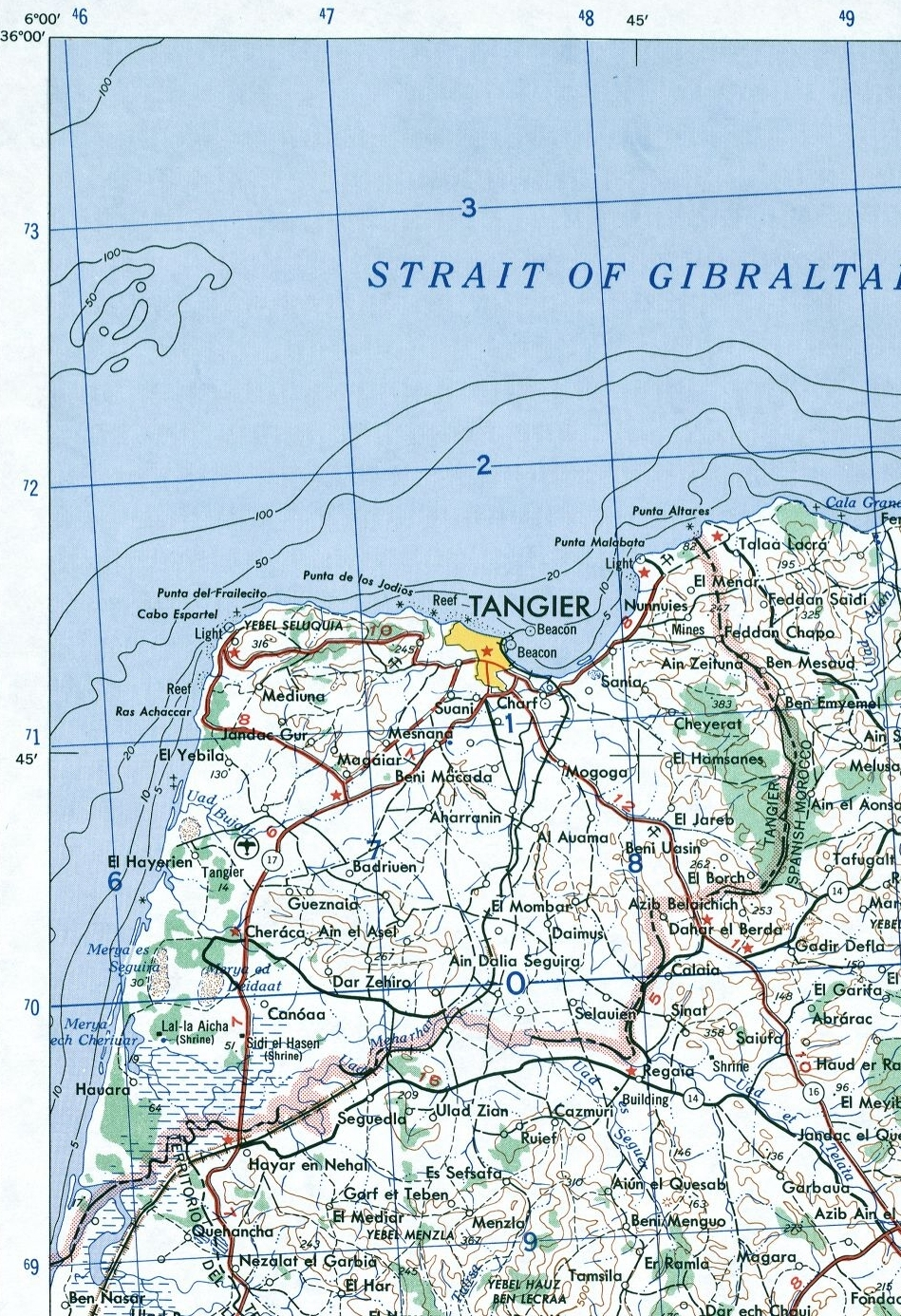
- Map of the Tangier International Zone, with boundary
- Status: International Zone
- Capital: Tangier
- Common languages: French, Spanish, Moroccan Arabic, English, Portuguese, Dutch, Haketia, Italian, Swedish
- Official languages: French, Spanish, Arabic
- Religion: Islam, Christianity, Judaism
- History
  - Established: 1 June 1925
  - Spanish occupation: 14 June 1940 – 11 October 1945
  - Disestablished: 29 October 1956

Area
  - Total: 382 km^{2} (147 sq mi)

Population
  - 1956 estimate: 125,000
- Currency: Moroccan franc
Preceded by	Succeeded by
Sultanate of Morocco	Kingdom of Morocco
- Today part of: Morocco

The Tangier International Zone (Arabic: منطقة طنجة الدولية, romanized: Minṭaqat Ṭanja ad-Duwaliyya; French: Zone internationale de Tanger; Spanish: Zona Internacional de Tánger) was a 382 km^{2} (147 sq mi) international zone centered on the city of Tangier, Morocco, which existed from 1925 until its reintegration into independent Morocco in 1956, with interruption during the Spanish occupation of Tangier (1940–1945), and special economic status extended until early 1960. Surrounded on the land side by the Spanish protectorate in Morocco, it was governed under a unique and complex system that involved several European nations, the United States (mainly after 1945), and the Sultan of Morocco, himself under a French protectorate. Due to its status as an international zone, Tangier played a crucial role for Moroccan nationalists, who wanted independence, to establish international contacts and recruit allies as well as organising gatherings and events.

== Background: early international governance in Tangier ==
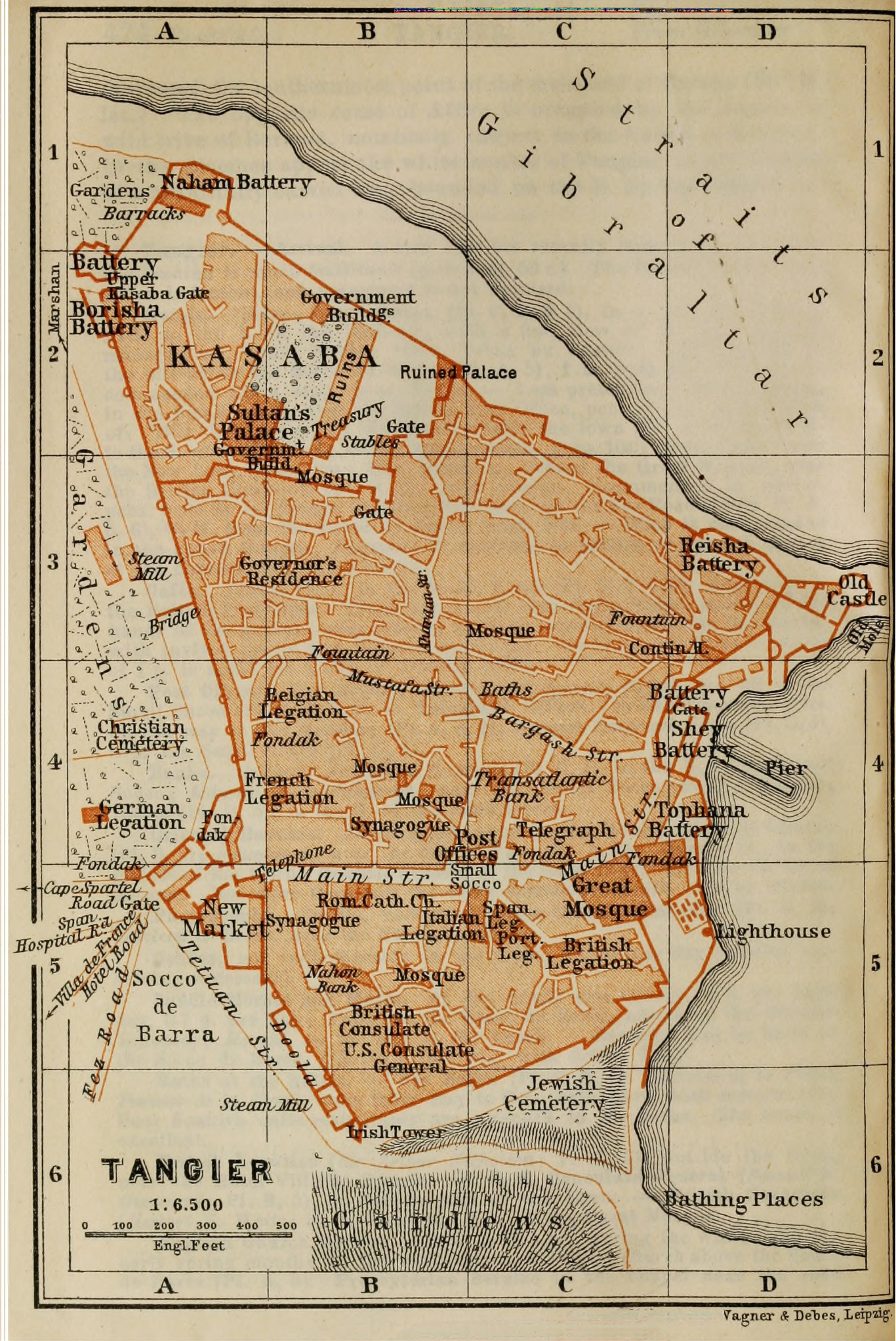
Baedeker map of Tangier in 1901, showing the walled Medina and multiple foreign consulates and legations

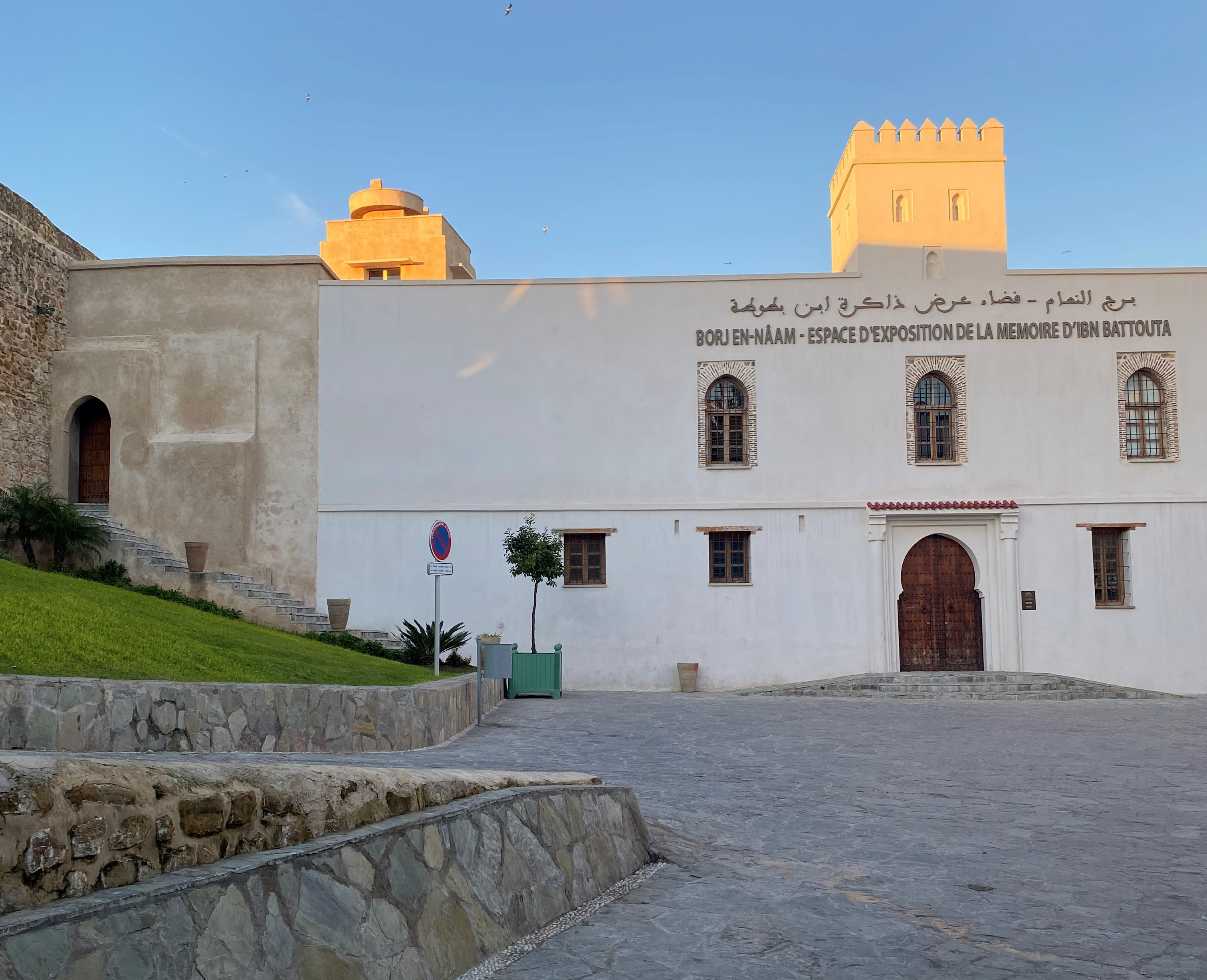
Borj en-Nâam barracks in the Kasbah of Tangier, former seat of the Spanish Tabor (city police) between 1906 and 1925

For nearly a century after the end of English rule in 1684, Tangier was primarily a military town, the main fortified outpost on the Moroccan Sultanate's side of the Strait of Gibraltar. This role evolved after Sultan Mohammed ben Abdallah designated it in 1777 as the main point of contact between the Moroccan monarchy and European commercial interests, leading to the gradual relocation of a number of consulates to the city by the main European nations. Great Britain, an ally of the Sultanate since 1713 as it needed Moroccan help to provision Gibraltar, moved its consul from Tétouan to Tangier in the 1770s, and the consul of France similarly moved in from Rabat in the early 1780s. By 1830, Denmark, France, Portugal, Sardinia, Spain, Sweden, Tuscany, the United Kingdom, and the United States all had consulates in Tangier. In 1851, the sultan appointed a permanent representative to the foreign powers in Tangier, the Naib, and in 1856, all remaining consulates were elevated to legations.

Since the Moroccan legal regime applied Islamic law only to Muslims and Judaic law only to Jews, foreign representatives were kept under a derogatory legal status defined by successive bilateral agreements with the Makhzen, the oldest of which appears to have been concluded with the Republic of Pisa in 1358. Such bilateral arrangements, known as capitulations, were signed with France in 1767, the United Kingdom in 1856, and Spain in 1861 in the wake of the Treaty of Wad Ras. In 1863, France and Morocco signed the so-called Béclard Convention which expanded the protégé system to France's benefit, which in 1880 was extended to other nations by the Treaty of Madrid. Under the capitulations' legal protection the United Kingdom established a postal service in Tangier in 1857, followed by France in 1860, Spain in 1861, and Germany in 1899; the Moroccan Sultanate followed suit with its own service in 1902.

The foreign powers in Tangier soon started developing joint projects, starting with matters of quarantine and public health as early as 1792. In 1840, a Dahir (decree) of Sultan Abd al-Rahman mandated them to establish a Sanitary Council (French: conseil sanitaire), chaired by the envoys of the represented nations on a rotating basis in the name of the Makhzen. In the early 1860s, the foreign nations for the creation of the Cape Spartel lighthouse, inaugurated in 1864.

In 1879, a Dahir of Sultan Hassan I created Tangier's Hygiene Commission (French: commission d'hygiène), which coexisted with the Sanitary Council and gradually took shape in the 1880s as a de facto municipal council, with members appointed by the foreign diplomats but also the Sultan and prominent local residents. The Hygiene Commission was chaired by the foreign envoys, on three-months turns with succession based on alphabetical order of nationality. Its leading executive was the vice chair, a position held for most of the decade from 1888 to 1898 by Spanish physician Severo Cenarro. In 1887, Greek-American community leader Ion Hanford Perdicaris advocated a special status for Tangier as a neutral free port under the great powers' joint control.

In 1892, the Hygiene Commission took over some of the tasks of the Sanitary Council (which nevertheless continued to exist in parallel), and was given legal form on 23 December 1893, with its role broadened and its name extended to road works (French: commission d'hygiène et de voirie) with authority to raise levies. In 1904, Tangier was chosen as location of the French-led Moroccan Debt Administration. That same year, a secret treaty between France and Spain acknowledged Tangier's special status and thus marked the first official prefiguration of later formal international arrangements.

The Algeciras Conference of 1906 established the State Bank of Morocco in Tangier, and also created new bodies for the city's management such as an Office of Public Works that in 1909 took over part of the services that had been managed by the Hygiene Commission. The Act of Algeciras also resulted in the creation of a dual police force under foreign control, the Tabor divided between French and Spanish components, respectively in charge of public order outside and inside the city limits.

In March 1912, the Treaty of Fes established the French protectorate in Morocco and raised again the status of Tangier. Both France and Spain wanted to control the city, while the United Kingdom wanted to neutralise it to maintain its dominance of the Strait of Gibraltar. Later that year, Article 7 of the Treaty Between France and Spain Regarding Morocco stipulated that Tangier would be granted a special status and defined its geographical boundaries. A technical committee of France, Spain and the UK met in Madrid in 1913, but only reached agreement in November 1914, after World War I had started, which allowed Spain, which was unsatisfied with the outcome, to suspend its implementation for several years. Meanwhile, Tangier still operated under an ad hoc governance regime with a Sultan-appointed governor, the Naib reduced to a largely ceremonial role since Morocco under the protectorates no longer had an autonomous foreign policy, the extraterritorial courts under the respective foreign delegations (downgraded back to consulate status for the same reason), the Sanitary Council, the Hygiene Commission, the French and Spanish Tabors, and assorted specialized committees.

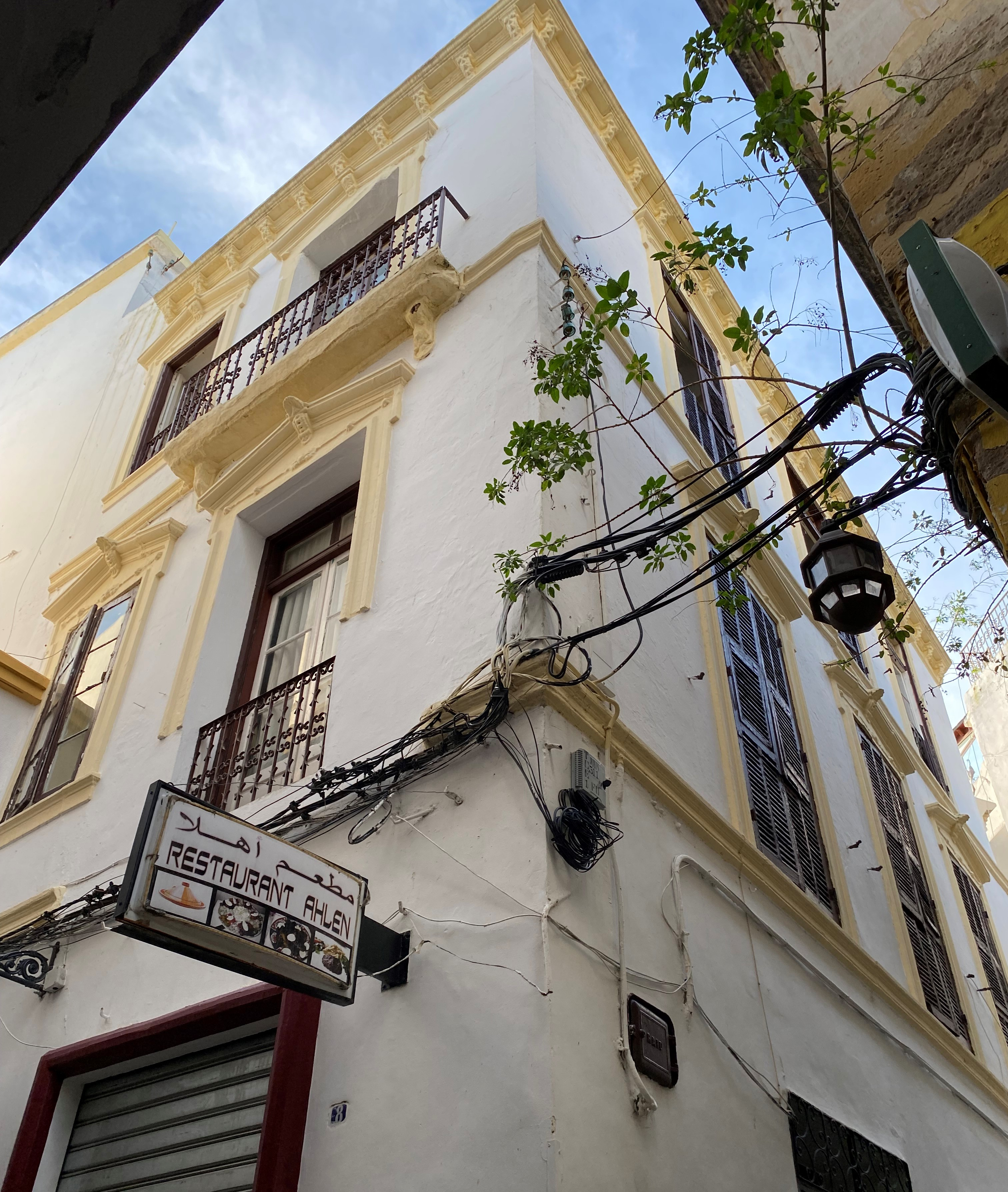
Former British legation in the Medina of Tangier

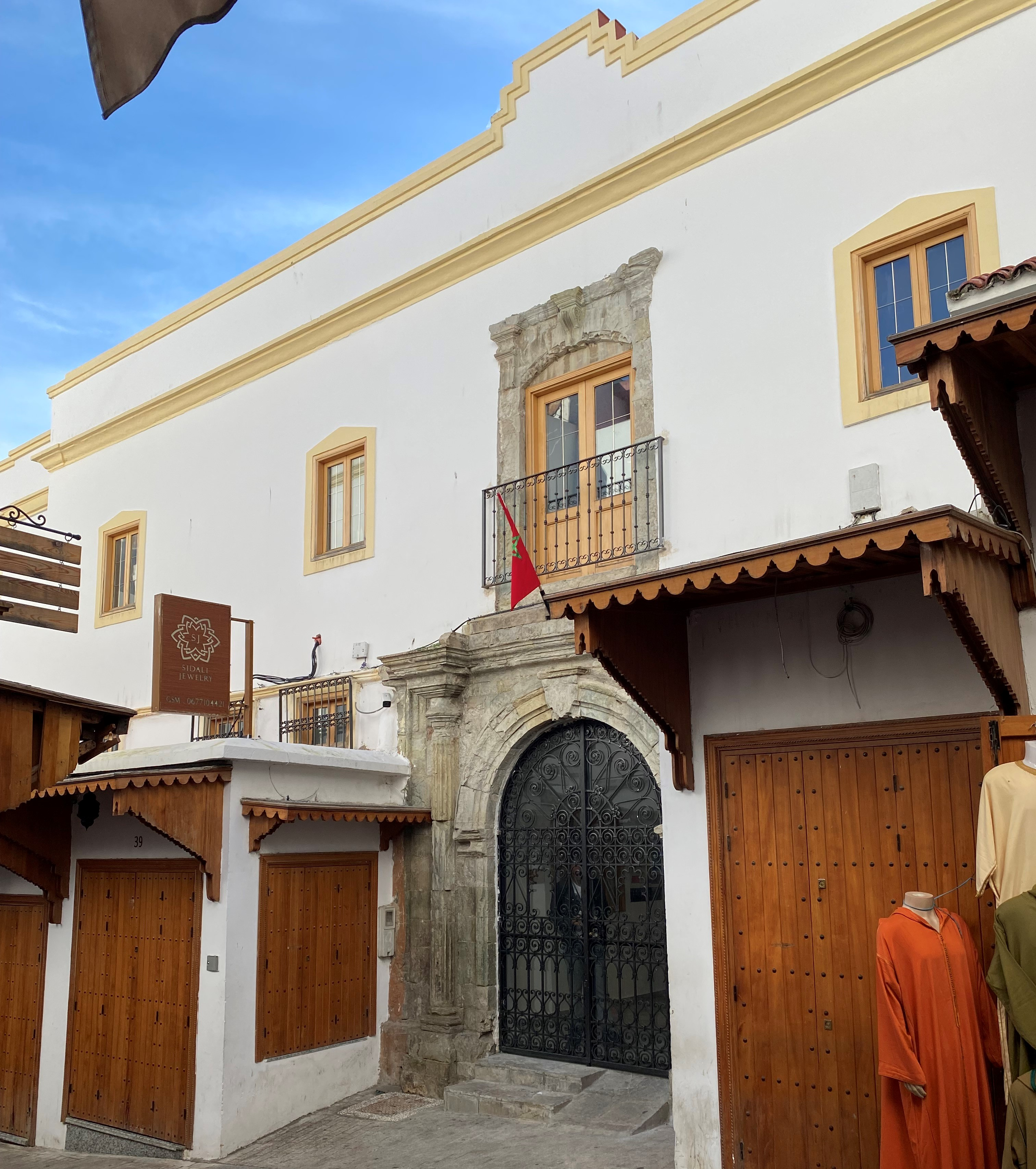
Former French legation until the mid-19th century, later Dar Niaba

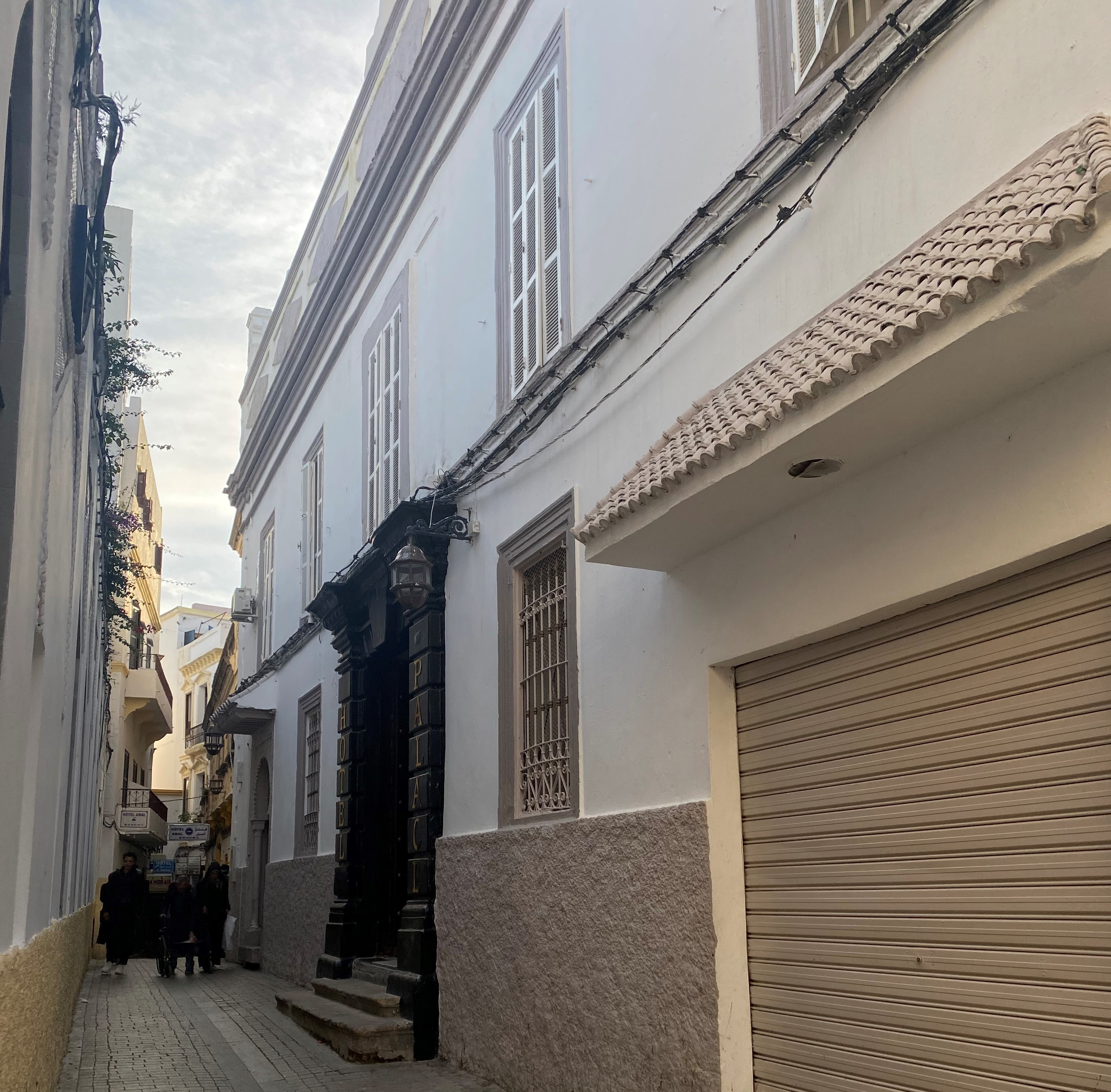
Former Spanish legation, erected in 1786; later Spanish post office

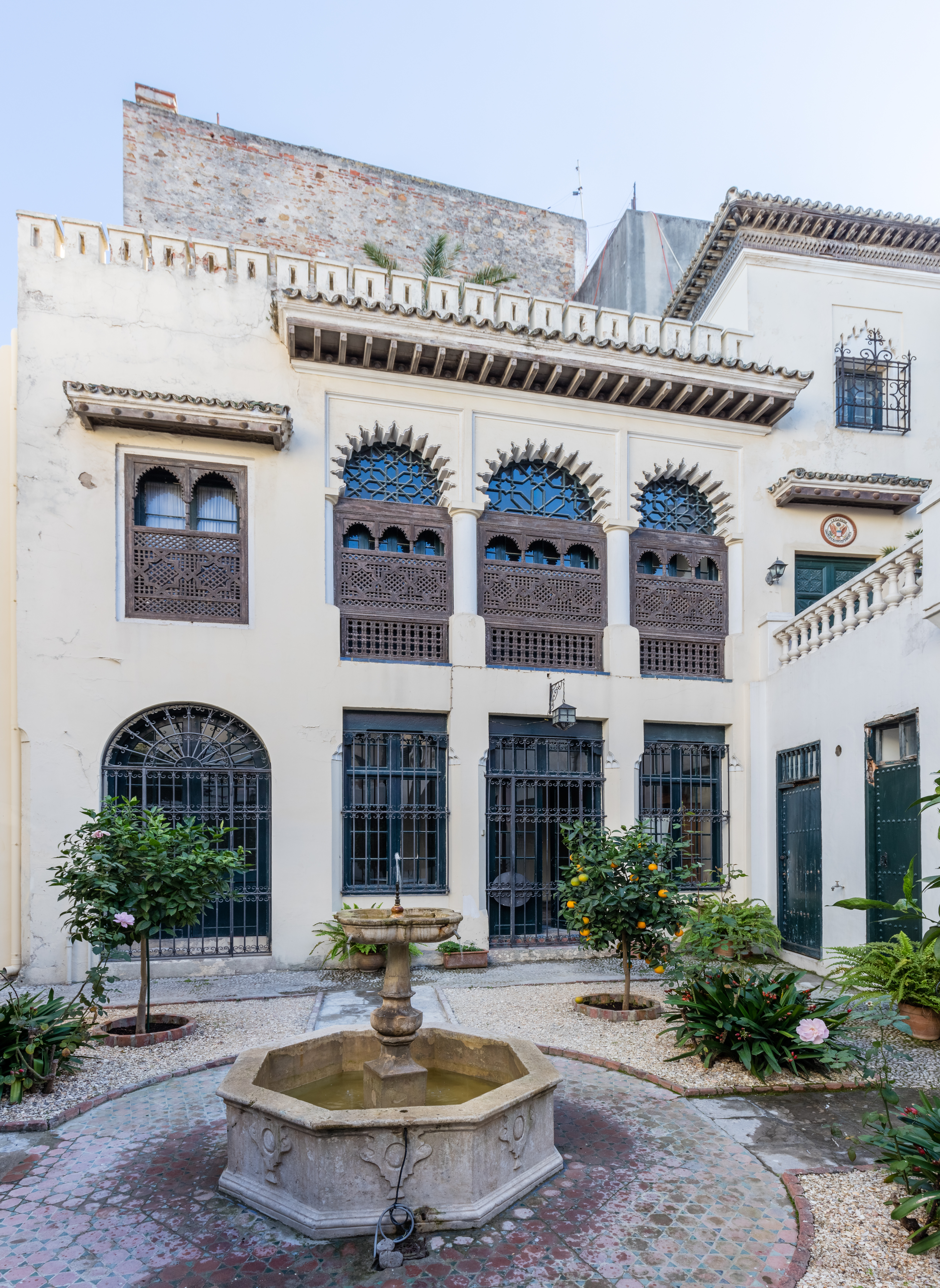
Former U.S. legation

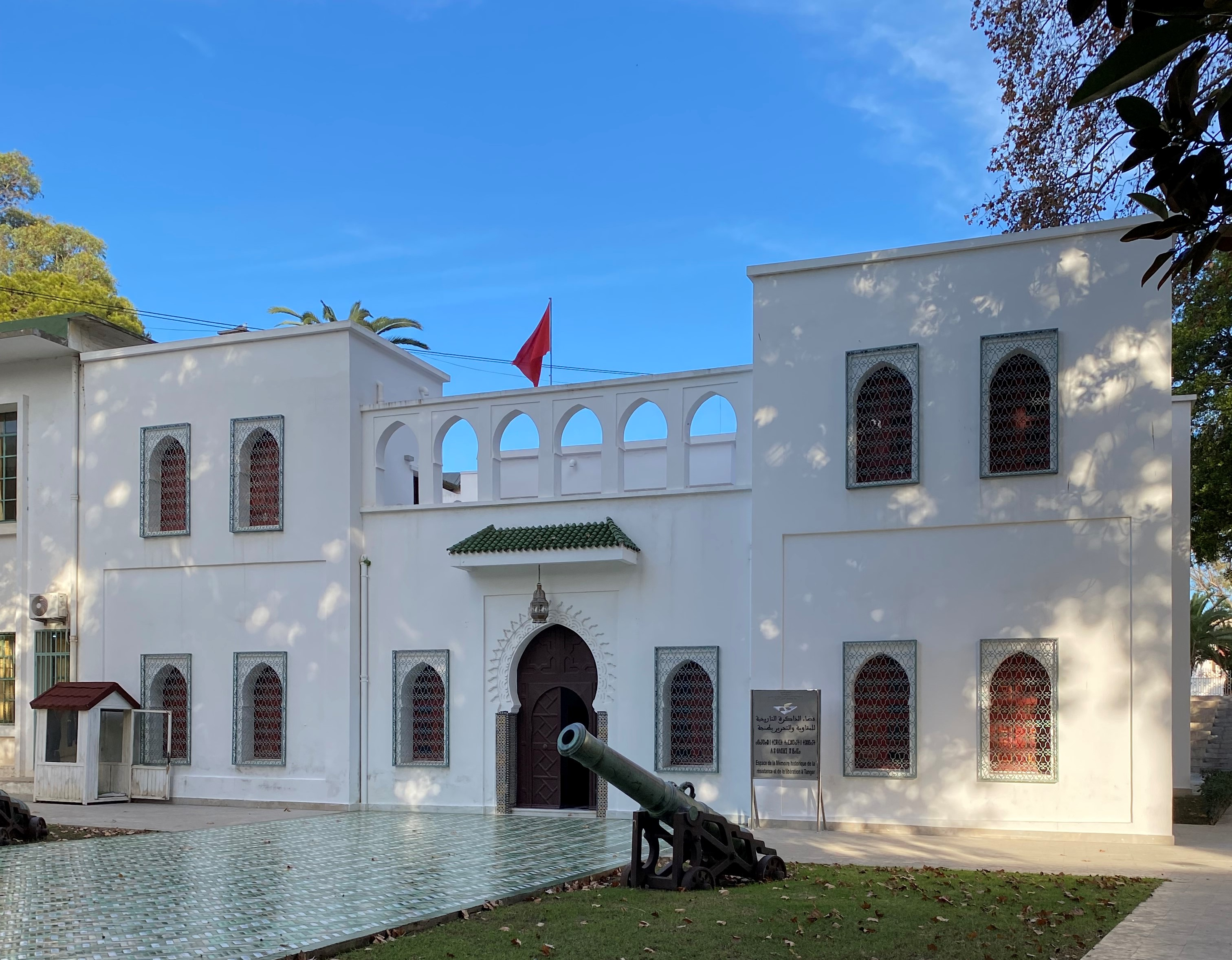
Former German legation just outside the Medina, later Mendoubia

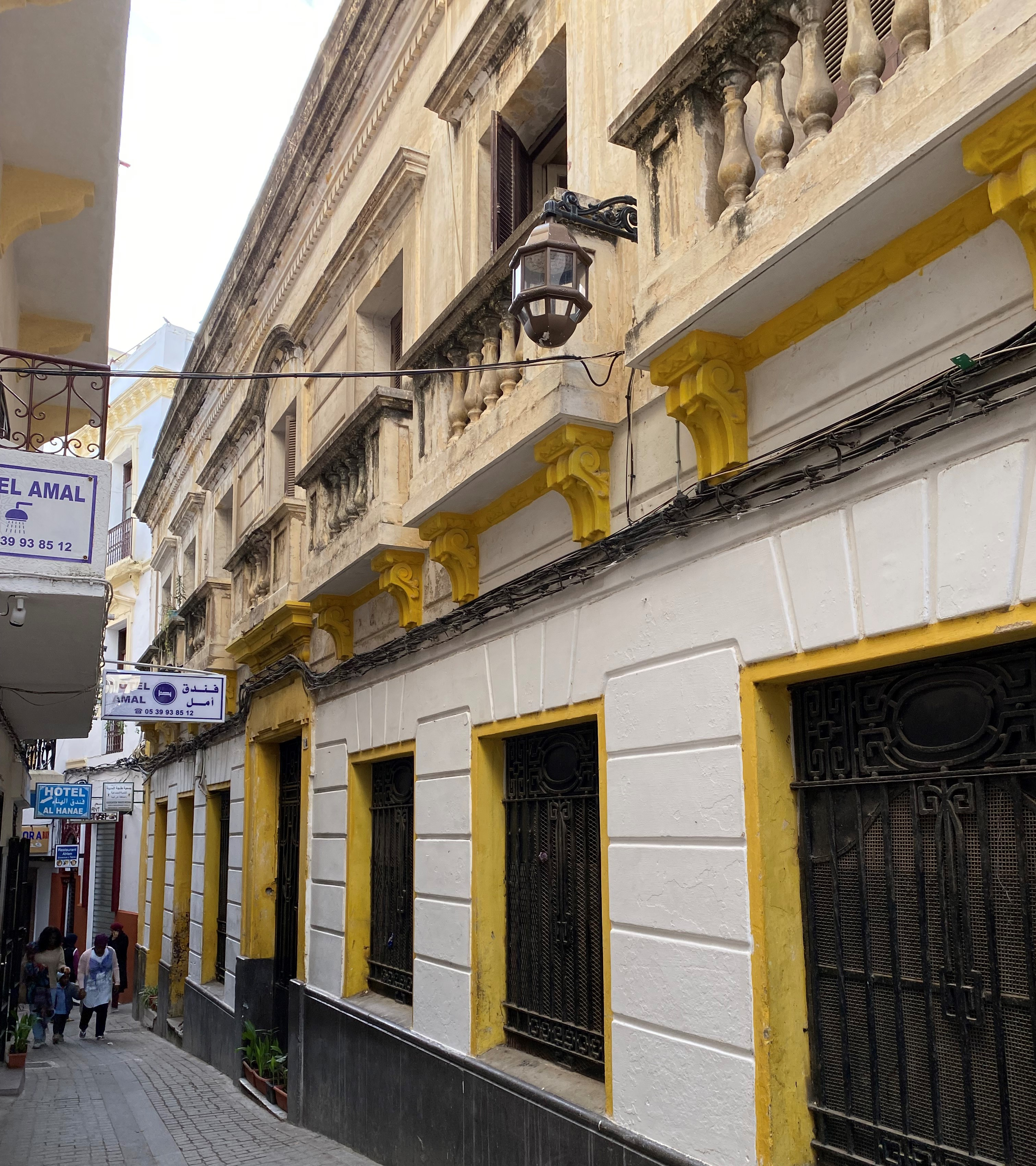
Former Portuguese legation in the Medina of Tangier

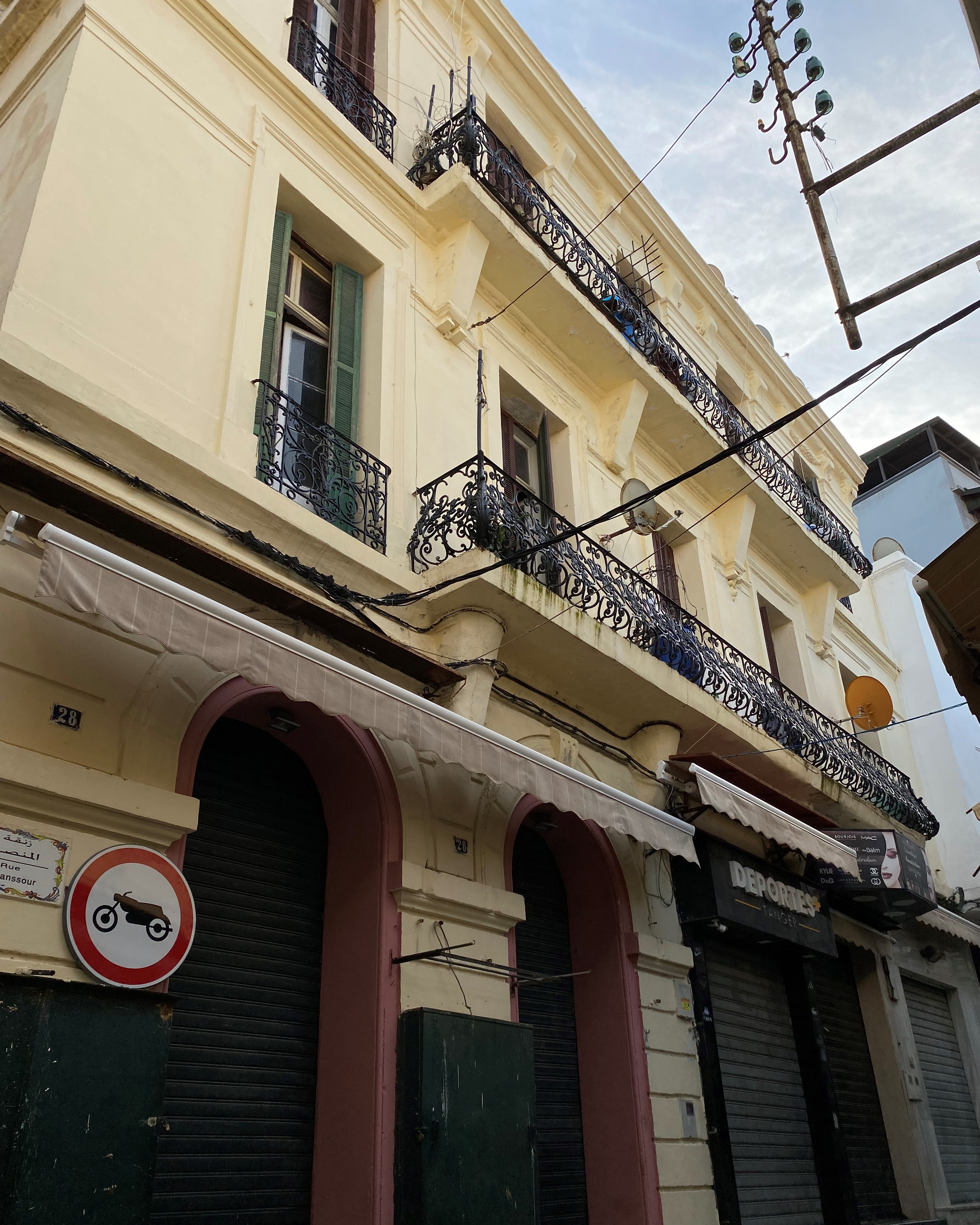
Former Danish legation in the Medina of Tangier

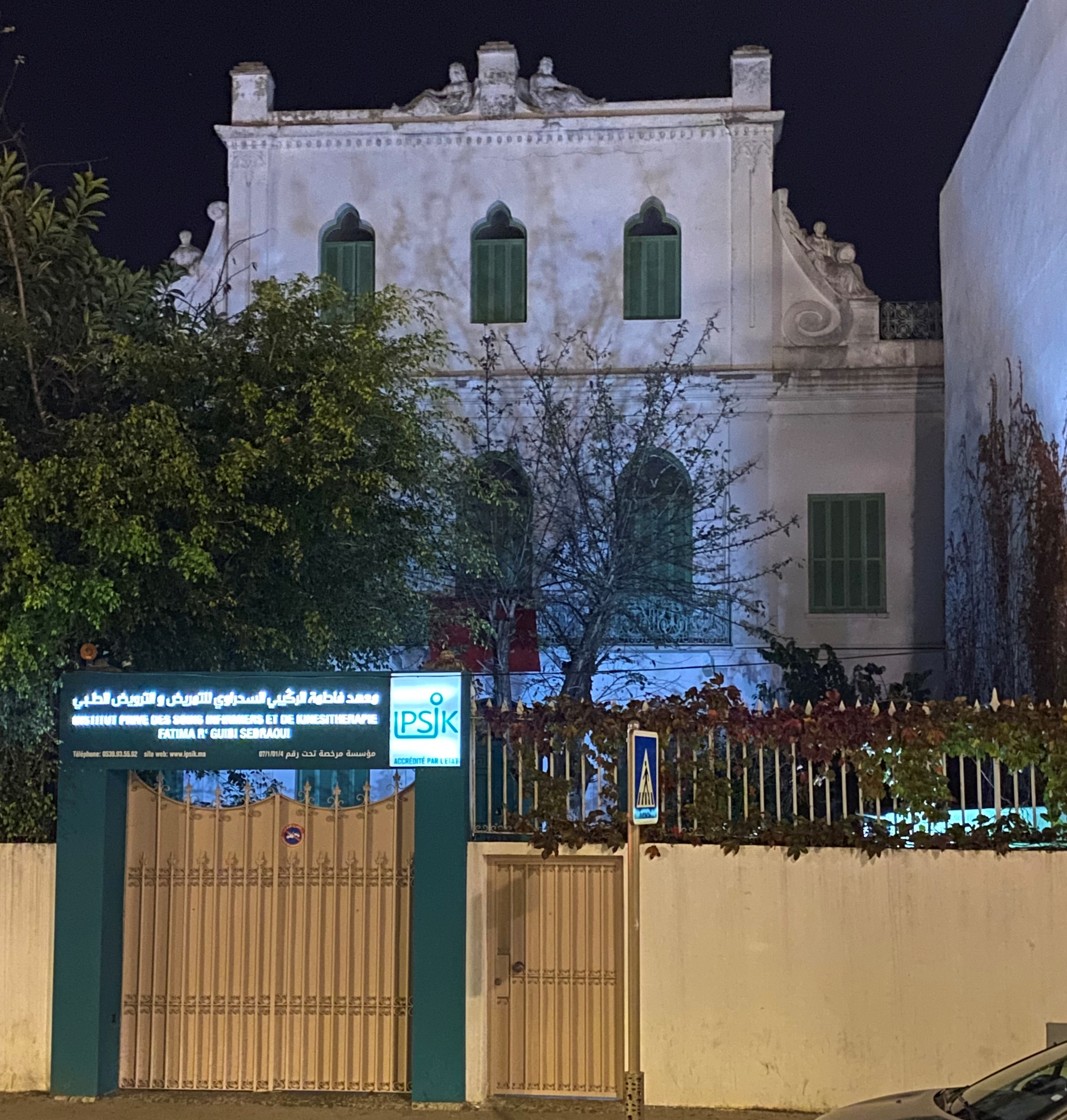
Former legation of Austria-Hungary

== History ==
Paris Convention of 1923

=== Paris Convention of 1923 and Protocol of 1928 ===
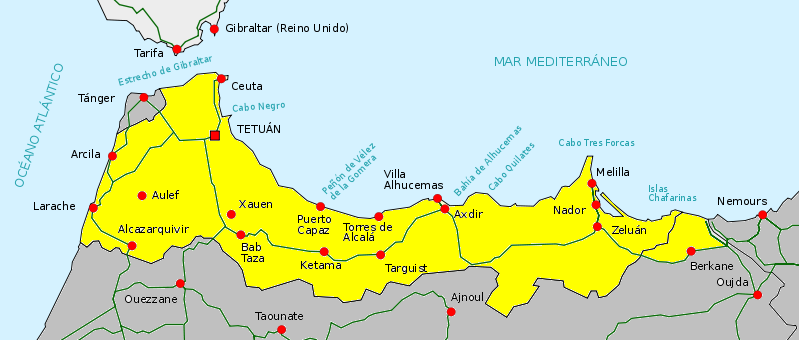
Tangier (top left) and the Spanish protectorate in Morocco

Negotiations restarted after the end of the war, in Cannes in 1922, followed by a preparatory conference in London in June 1923, and a follow-up conference in Paris that started in October and concluded with a convention signed by France, Spain and the UK on 18 December 1923, ignoring Italy's stated wish to participate as well. Under that Paris Convention, Tangier was made a neutral zone under joint administration by the participating countries. In line with UK wishes, it was entirely free from any military presence. It was also made into a tax haven, with no tariffs on imported or exported goods or gold, no exchange controls, no income or revenue taxes, and unlimited freedom of establishment.

Ratifications of the signatories were exchanged in Paris on 14 May 1924. The entry into force of the Paris Convention was further delayed by translation challenges, so that the Tangier International Zone eventually started on 1 June 1925 under a Dahir of 15 May 1925. Simultaneously, the tasks of prior institutions including the Sanitary Council and Hygiene Commission were taken over by the new International Administration, even though the bodies themselves continued to exist for a few more years. The Paris Convention was proposed for ratification to the other powers that were party to the Algeciras Conference, except Germany, Austria and Hungary, disempowered by the peace treaties (respectively of Versailles, Saint-Germain and Trianon), and the Soviet Union, then estranged from the international system. It was ratified by Belgium (on 6 December 1924), Sweden, the Netherlands (on 5 October 1925), and eventually by Portugal (on 28 January 1926), putting an end to an awkward early period during which the Committee of Control practically could not reach a quorum. Fascist Italy had declined to ratify the Paris Convention as it insisted on equal status as a "great Mediterranean power" and was offended about not having been invited to the negotiation in Paris; the United States, meanwhile, preferred to keep their freedom of action. Both consequently kept their nationals under their respective systems of consular courts.

Italy's demand to join the international framework on a par with the signatories of the Paris Convention was supported by Spain from 1926, then by the UK, and a new conference eventually started in Paris in March 1928. The new protocol, amending the previous Paris Convention of 1923, was signed there on 25 July 1928. It was then ratified by Belgium (25 July 1928), Sweden (19 October 1928), Portugal (15 January 1929), and the Netherlands (12 June 1929). That revision also allowed the final abolition of Tangier's former ad hoc institutions, the Sanitary Council and Hygiene Commission, which Italy had previously insisted to maintain.

=== Spanish wartime occupation ===
Spanish troops occupied Tangier on 14 June 1940, the same day Paris fell to the Germans. Despite calls by the writer Rafael Sánchez Mazas and other Spanish nationalists to annex "Tánger español", the Francoist State publicly considered the occupation a temporary protection measure, occasionally presented as a way to shield Tangier against the risk of German or Italian invasion and thus safeguard Tangier's neutrality. The Zone's key institutions, the Committee of Control and Legislative Assembly, were abolished on 3 November 1940, triggering a diplomatic dispute between Britain and Spain that led to a further guarantee of British rights and a Spanish promise not to fortify the area. Tangier was effectively annexed to the Spanish Protectorate of Morocco on 23 November 1940. In May 1944, Franco expelled all German diplomats from the Zone.

=== Postwar re-establishment ===
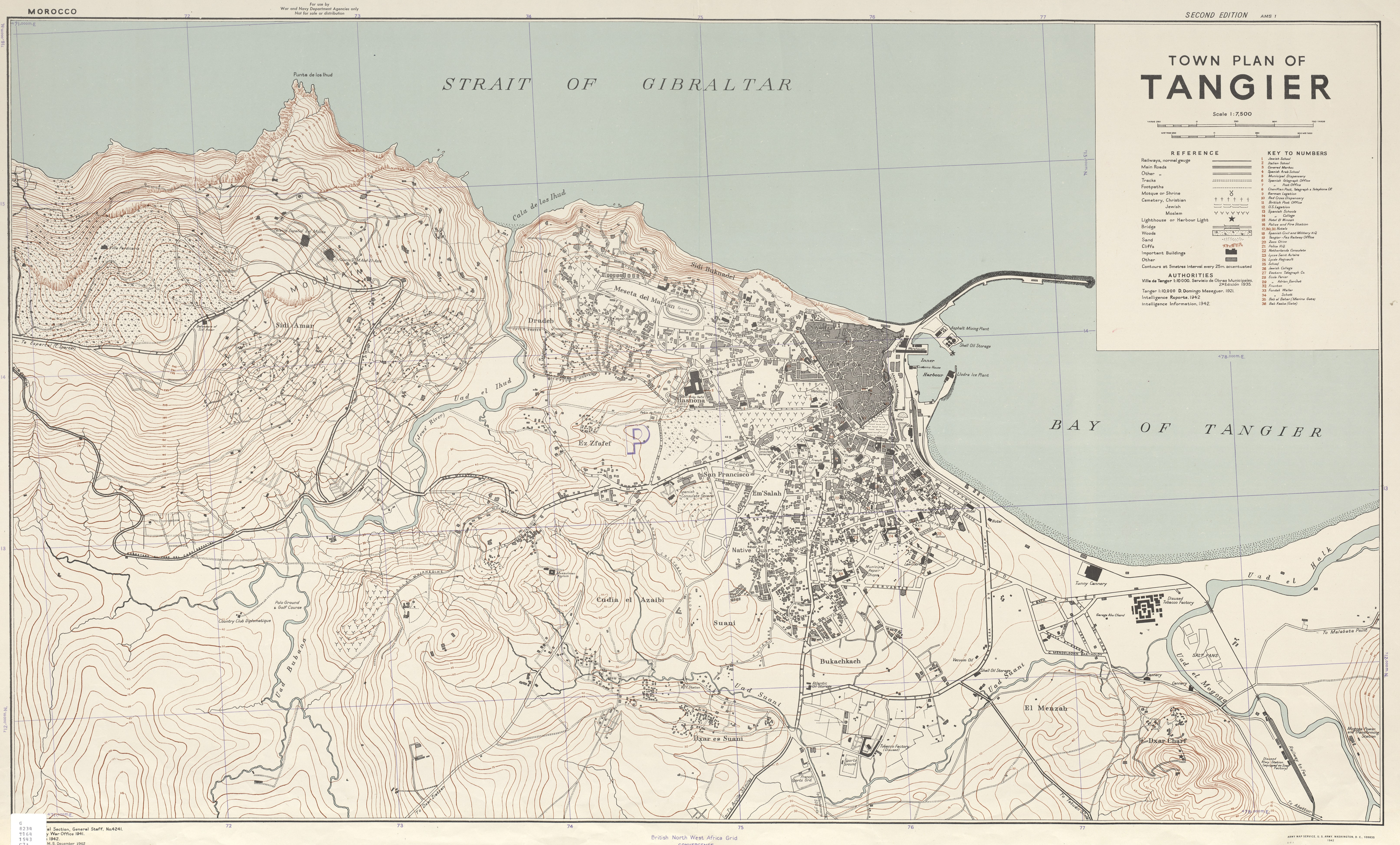
US Army Map Service map of Tangier in 1944

A quadripartite conference (France, Soviet Union, UK and United States) met in Paris in August 1945, with Francoist Spain excluded at Soviet insistence. It concluded with a temporary Anglo-French Agreement of 31 August 1945, in which the two powers made arrangements for the re-establishment of the Zone's international institutional framework, invited the United States and the Soviet Union to join it, and reversed the advantages that Italy had secured under the 1928 Protocol. The intent at the time was to establish a new permanent statute following an ad hoc conference. The Anglo-French Agreement entered into force on 11 October 1945, when the Spanish government withdrew its military force and handed over the territory's government to the revived international institutions.

From then on, the U.S. participated in the Committee of Control and appointed a judge to the Mixed Courts. The Soviet Union soon relinquished interest in Tangier, however, which allowed Spain to participate again in the international framework albeit without positions in the administration, and Italy to recover its former position in the Mixed Courts..

A new status was eventually negotiated from August 1952 and finalized on 10 November 1952, with two documents: a protocol amending the Anglo-French Agreement of 31 August 1945 on various aspects of the Zone's administration, signed and subsequently ratified by Belgium, France, Italy, the Netherlands, Portugal, Spain, the United Kingdom, and the United States; and a separate convention signed by France, Italy, Spain and the United Kingdom, by which the Mixed Courts were reformed into an International Jurisdiction with more judges. This entered into force by Dahir of the Sultan on 10 June 1953.

=== Termination ===
Following the end of the French protectorate on 2 March 1956 and of the Spanish one on 7 April 1956, the Committee of Control of the Tangier Zone met in June 1956 and proposed a protocol for a temporary regime, which was signed by Moroccan Foreign Minister Ahmed Balafrej on behalf of Sultan Mohammed V in Rabat on 5 July 1956. As a consequence, the position of Administrator was abolished and replaced on 10 July 1956 by that of a Moroccan governor or Amel, which was immediately assumed by the Mendoub Ahmad at-Tazi. Simultaneously, the Tangier police force was transferred under Moroccan authority. A conference was subsequently held in October 1956, opening in Fedala (later Mohammedia) on the 8th and transferred to Tangier on the 10th. Balafrej insisted that, while the abolition of the international status was a matter of negotiation with the foreign powers represented in the Committee of Control (namely Belgium, France, Italy, the Netherlands, Portugal, Spain, the UK, and the United States), the future arrangements were not and would be decided solely by the Moroccan authorities. The resulting protocol signed on 29 October 1956 returned Tangier to full Moroccan sovereignty with immediate effect, while the operation of its international institutions was extended for practical purposes only until the end of 1956.

On 24 August 1957, Mohammed V granted a charter to smooth the transition and extend the Zone's tax and other privileges for some more time. The Moroccan monarchy's attitudes towards the country's northern region turned sharply negative with the 1958 Rif riots, however. By Dahir of 17 October 1959, Mohammed V abrogated the charter with only a six-months notice period. The expiration of that transition in April 1960 marked the final end of Tangier's special status.

== Institutions ==
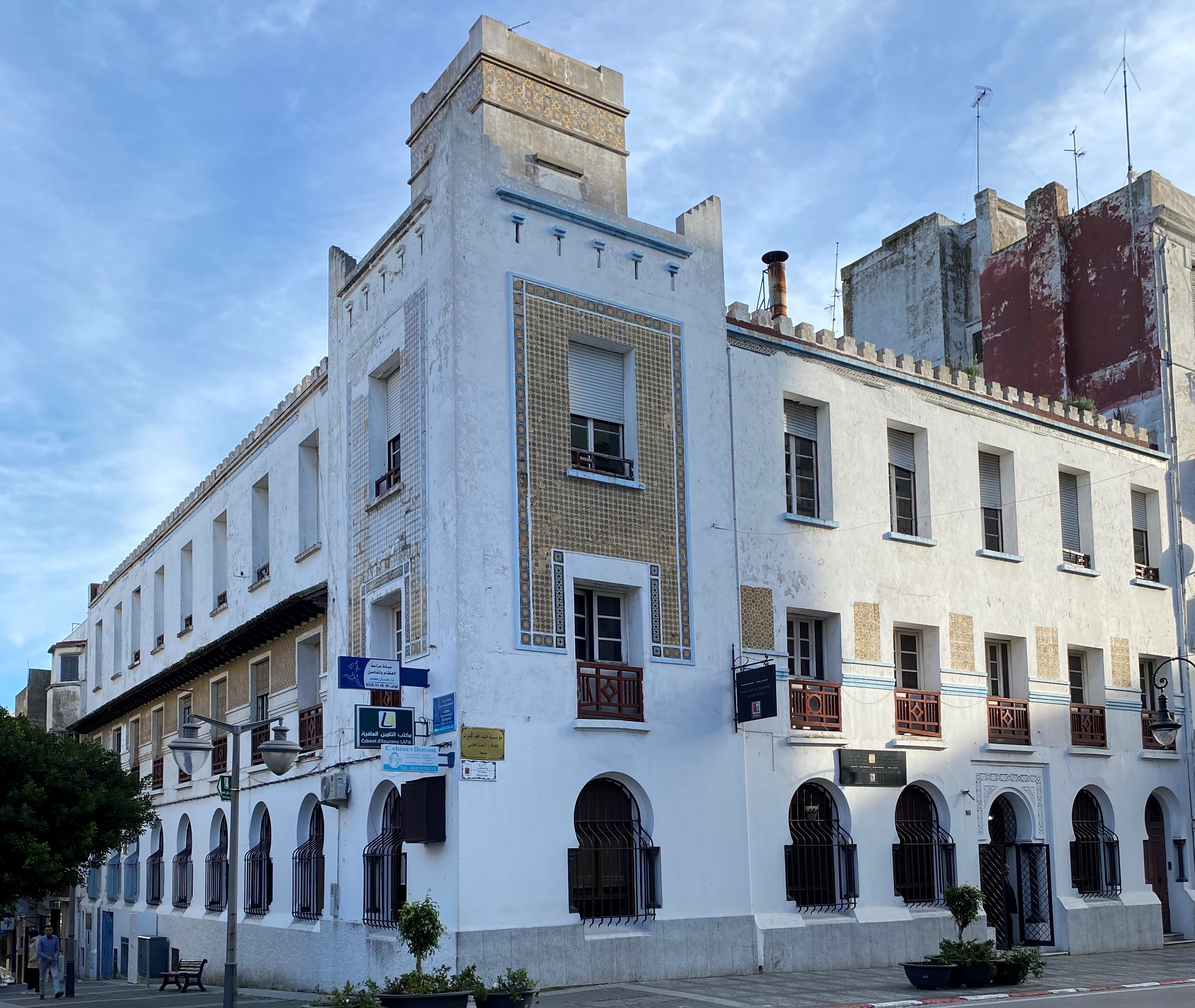
Former Debt Administration building (Dar Al-Salaf), first office of the International Zone's Administration in the Interwar period

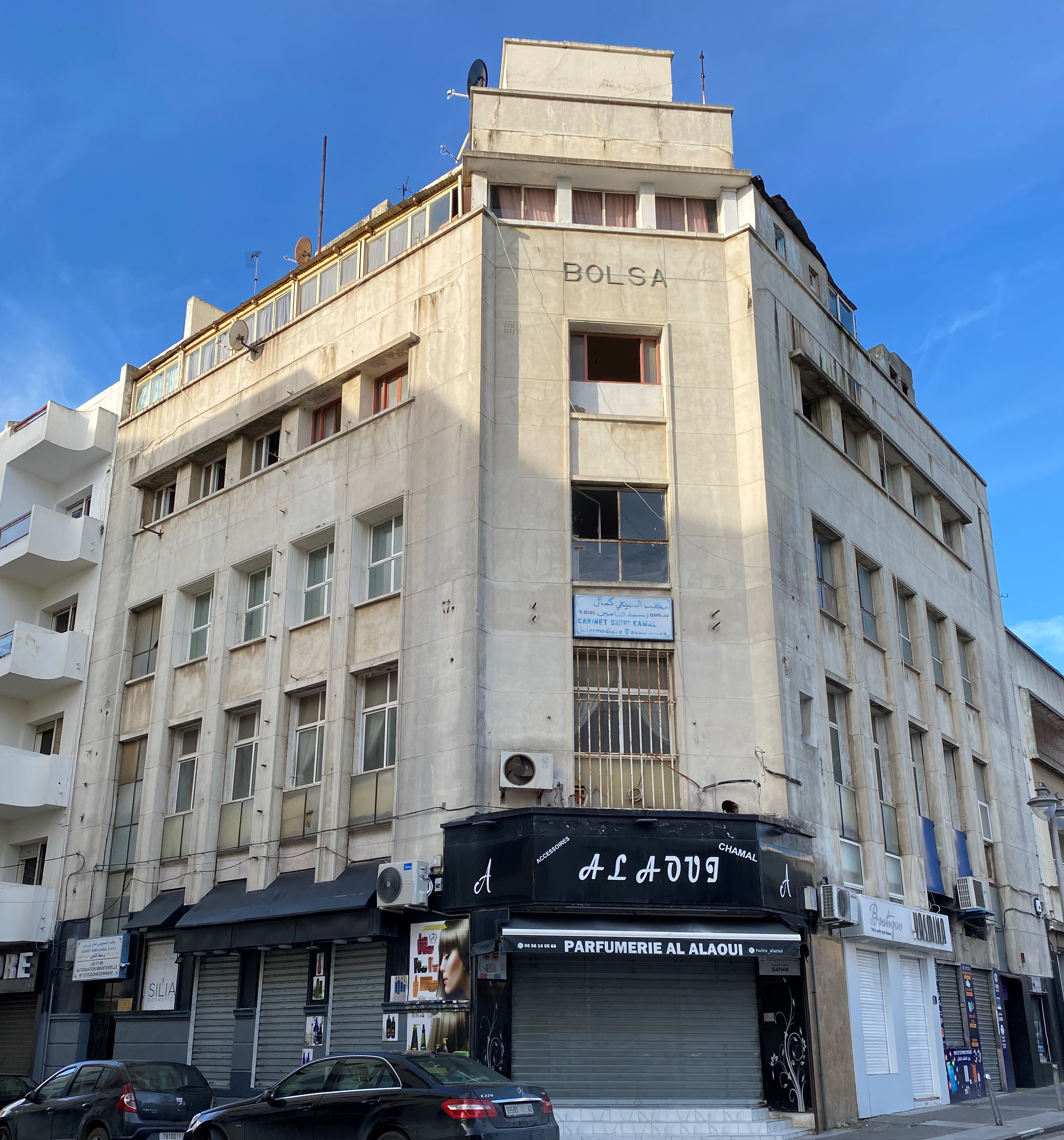
Former stock exchange building in the Ville Nouvelle

The Zone's governance framework was in many ways unique, and ridden with ambiguities. It was frequently renegotiated and perceived as temporary, with different participating countries constantly jockeying for influence, resulting in administrative overlap and inefficiency. It rested on five main institutions: the Committee of Control, an oversight body; the Administrator (executive); the Legislative Assembly (legislature); the Mixed Courts (judiciary); and the Mendoub, or representative of the Sultan, with executive and judiciary authority over matters exclusively related to the Muslim and Jewish communities.

=== Committee of Control ===
The Committee of Control was formed by the Consuls of the participating powers. Its chair rotated on a yearly basis. It held a veto right over the Legislative Assembly's bills, without right of appeal except before the Permanent Court of International Justice in the Hague.

=== Administrator ===
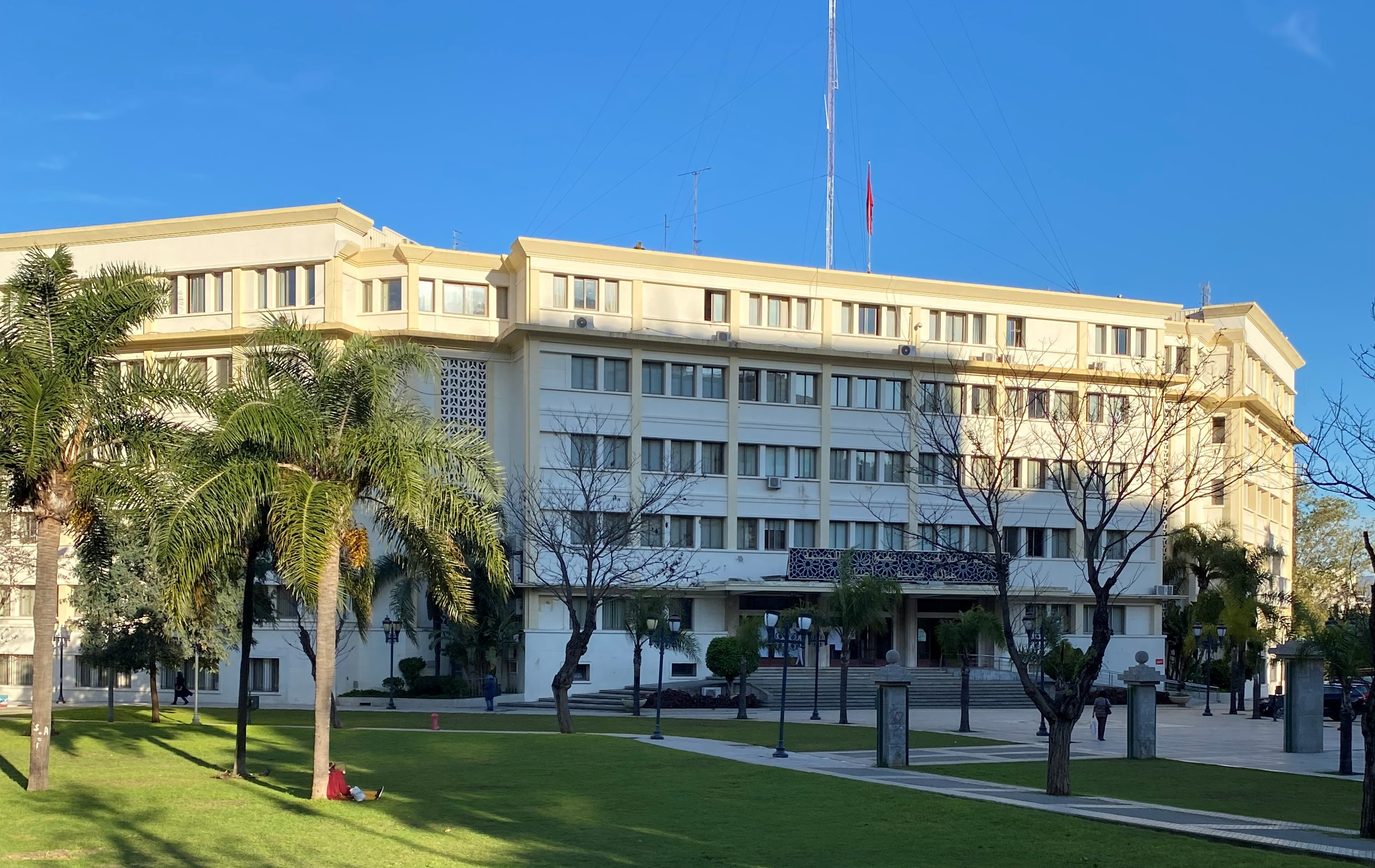
Former building of the International Zone's Administration, inaugurated ca. 1952

Executive power was vested in an Administrator, except for the (majority) Muslim and Jewish communities under the authority of the Mendoub. The Administrator was formally appointed by the Sultan, on a proposal by the Committee of Control.

In the interwar period all Administrators were French, until the Spanish takeover of June 1940. They had two deputies, one French and one British. After the re-establishment of the international regime in 1945, the new arrangements were more favorable to smaller nations, resulting in successive Portuguese (1945–1948 and 1951–1954), Dutch (1948–1951), and Belgian (1954–1956) nationals holding the position.

In the zone's early years and until 1937, the Administrator and his staff worked in the building of the Moroccan Debt Administration, on Boulevard Pasteur. From 1937 to the Spanish takeover, they appear to have been at least partly located at the nearby French Consulate. A new building constructed to house the International Administration was completed in the early 1950s.

The Administrator nominated the (generally Spanish) head of the urban police, for ratification by the Legislative Assembly; the police was complemented by a gendarmerie, headed by a Belgian captain. These replaced the prior French and Spanish Tabors that had been established under the Act of Algeciras.

=== Legislative Assembly ===
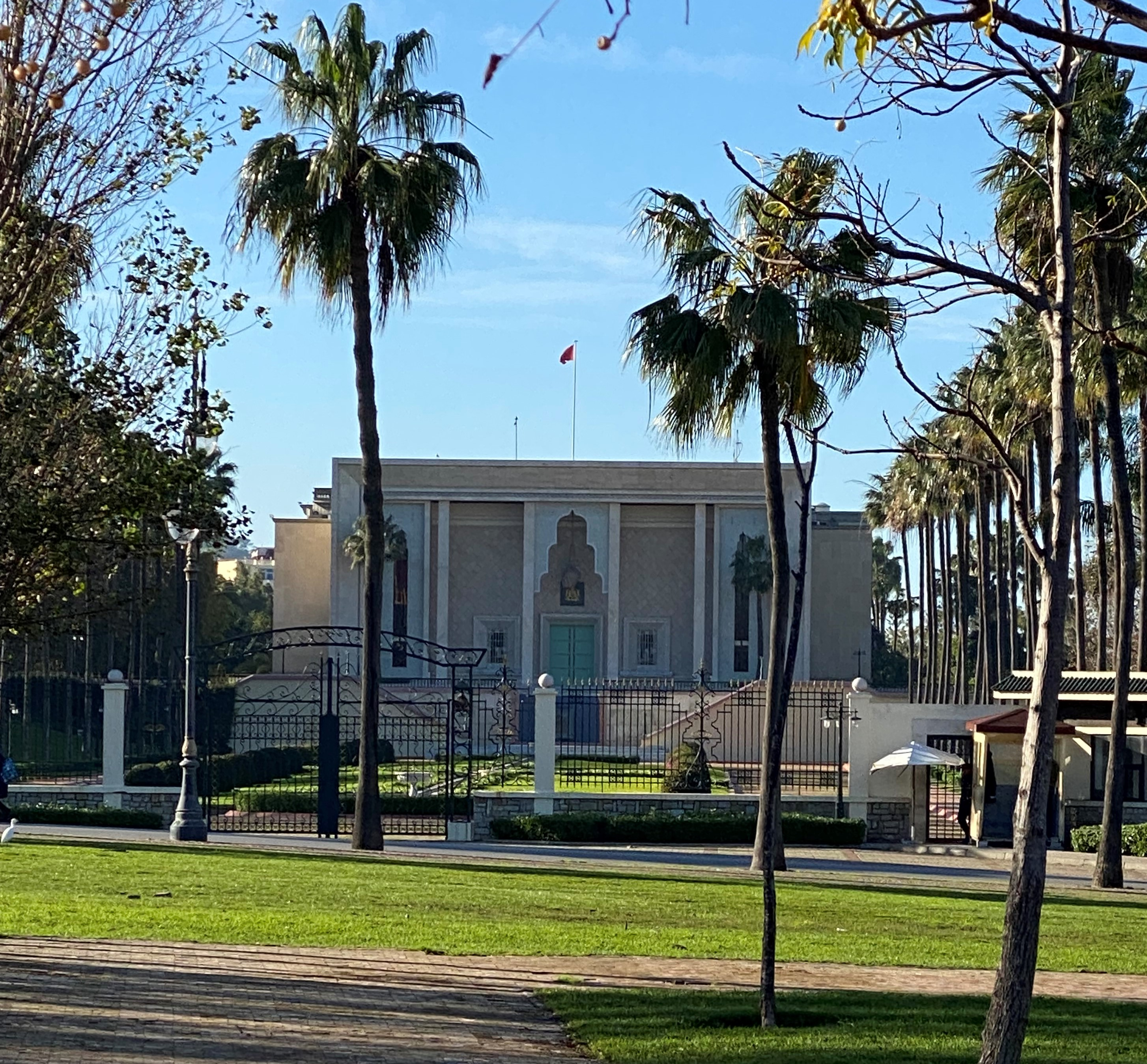
Former seat of the International Legislative Assembly, later remodeled and repurposed as Marshan Palace

The zone's legislature was the International Legislative Assembly, which retained some features of the prior Hygiene Commission. It was chaired by the Mendoub and supervised by the Committee of Control. The assembly's membership was set as follows:

Nationality		Number of seats
French		4
Spanish		4
British		3
Italian		2 (until 1928); 3 (1928–1940); 1 (from 1945)
American		1 (until 1940, unoccupied); 3 (from 1945)
Belgian		1
Dutch		1
Portuguese		1
Moroccan	Muslim	6
Moroccan	Jewish	3

The Moroccan members were designated by the Mendoub, which in practice made the Assembly a French-dominated body. After World War II, a new home was built for the Legislative Assembly in the Marshan neighborhood of Tangier, across the street from the Mendoub's Residence.

=== Mixed Courts / International Jurisdiction ===
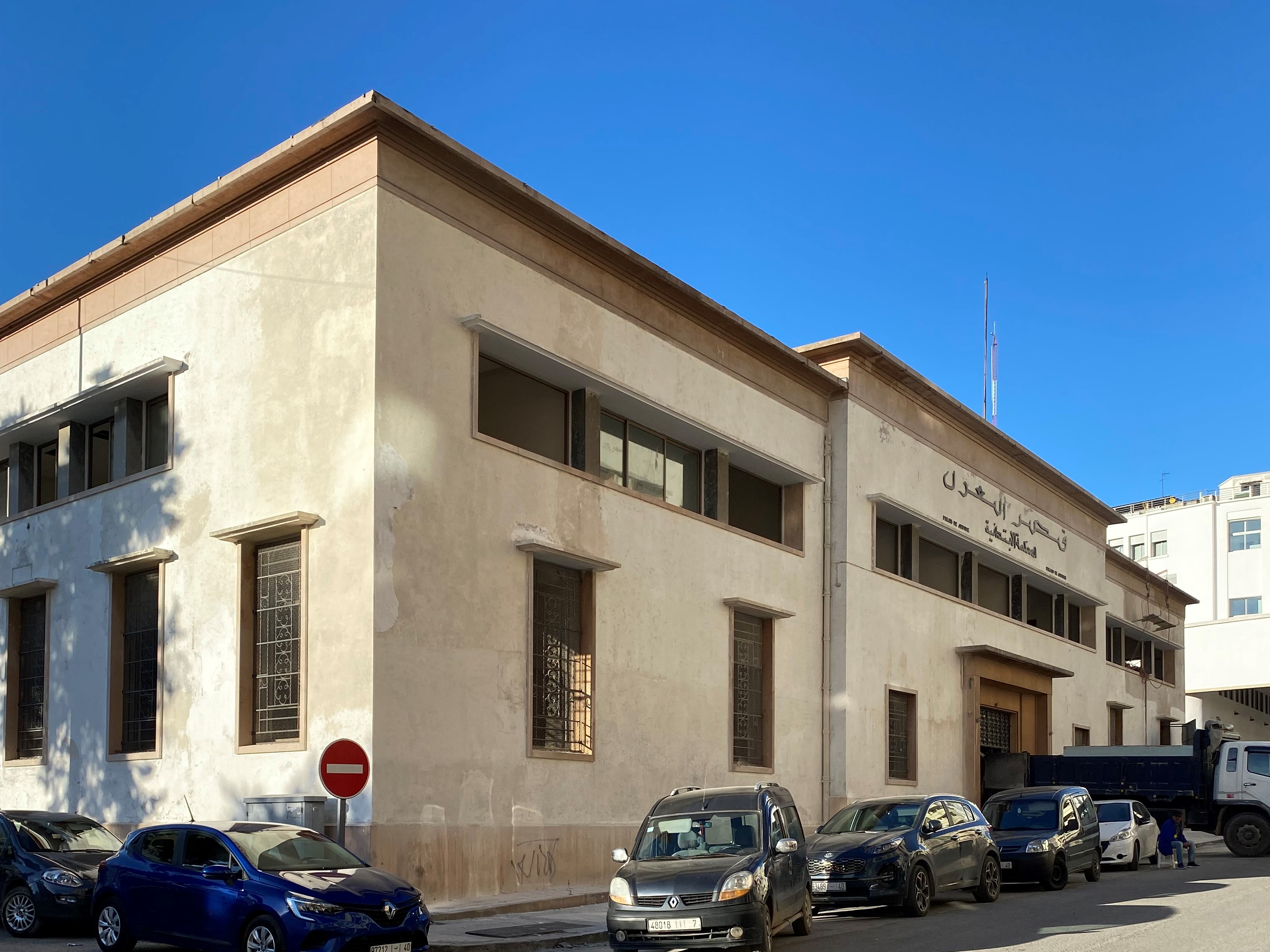
Former seat of the Mixed Courts, under renovation in late 2022

Judicial power over the Zone's residents from the participating powers resided in the Mixed Courts. Under the initial Paris Convention of 1923, these had four judges (two British, one French and one Spanish), expanded in 1928 to five, respectively appointed by the Belgian, British, Spanish, French, and Italian governments, They worked with two prosecutors, one French and one Spanish. As a result of the creation of the Mixed Courts, the participating European powers withdrew the consular courts that previously exercised jurisdiction there. From the start, the Mixed Courts were considered a unique experiment given their international setup. The applicable law was a blend of French and Spanish codes, depending on the specific matter, and the Courts' official languages were French and Spanish. Unlike other institutions of the zone, the Mixed Courts continued to function under the Spanish occupation of Tangier during World War II.

Following the convention of November 1952, the renamed International Jurisdiction included 2 judges from France, 2 from Spain, and 1 from each of Belgium, Italy, Morocco, the Netherlands, Portugal, Sweden, the UK, and the U.S., as well as Spanish and French prosecutors. Even after that reform, it remained affected by shortcomings that included inadequate representation of Muslim Moroccans and an insufficient number of judges.

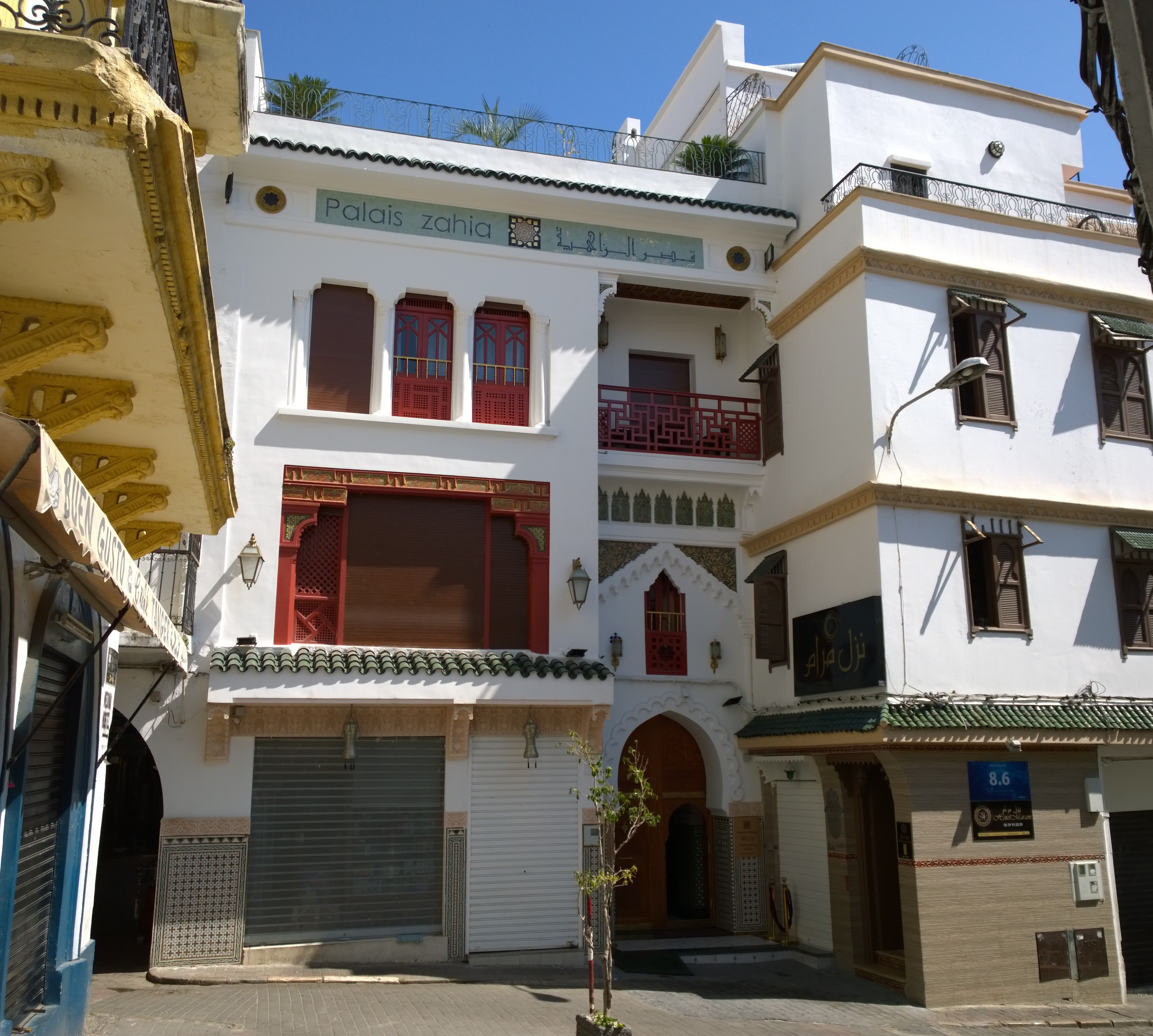
Palais Zahia building in the medina of Tangier, the State Bank of Morocco's head office from 1907 to 1952

The Mixed Courts were only one component of Tangier's complex system of jurisdictions. Cases pertaining exclusively to the Muslim and Jewish communities were handled by the Court of the Mendoub and the respective Islamic and Rabbinical jurisdictions under the Mendoub's authority. American citizens remained under the pre-1923 extraterritorial jurisdiction of the consular court of the United States, except for matters of property title and Islamic law. The State Bank of Morocco, whose head office was in Tangier, remained under the jurisdiction of a special tribunal created by Article 45 of the Act of Algeciras of 7 April 1906, from which appeals went to the Federal Supreme Court of Switzerland in Lausanne.

The Mixed Courts were initially located together with the International Administration on Boulevard Pasteur. In 1937, they moved to a purpose-built art deco courthouse on rue Washington (now avenue Omar Ibn Al Khattab), which after Moroccan independence became the city courthouse (French: palais de justice).

=== Mendoub ===
The Mendoub had direct authority over the (majority) Muslim and Jewish communities, similar to that of Pashas or Qadis in other parts of Morocco under the Protectorates. He also chaired the Legislative Assembly, albeit without a vote of his own, and enacted its laws and regulations, but only after prior countersignature by the Chair of the Committee of Control. His office was in the Mendoubia.

== Economy and culture ==
The initial economic effect of the creation of the International Zone was sharply negative, because the Spanish protectorate authorities discouraged commerce with it and thus Tangier lost most of its traditional hinterland. Tangier had handled nineteen percent of Morocco's imports in 1906, but only four percent in 1929.

With time, however, the service activities favoured by the zone's special status enabled a gradual recovery. The Zone had a reputation for tolerance, diversity of culture, religion, and bohemianism. It became a tourist hotspot for literary giants and gay men from Western countries. Many of the latter were able to live an openly "out" life in the Zone.

The activity of Tangier as an offshore financial centre and tax haven took off in the postwar period. In 1950, there were 85 banks in Tangier, up from 4 in 1900 and 15 in 1939. Its practice of banking secrecy was extreme, with effectively no bank licensing, no prudential supervision, no accounting obligations, and no transparency whatsoever about a bank's ownership. In some cases, the senior management of a Tangier bank would not even know who the bank's owners were. One author wrote that "the authorities of Tangier had pushed to an unequaled degree of perfection the art of non-governing by reciprocal annulment of rival sovereignties. They took care, better than elsewhere, of the rigorous application of an almost total non-taxation".

In the years leading up to the First World War, Tangier had a population of about 40,000, about half Muslim, a quarter Jewish, and a quarter European Christians. By 1956, the population had more than doubled, comprising around 40,000 Muslims, 31,000 Christians, and 15,000 Jews.

== Aftermath ==
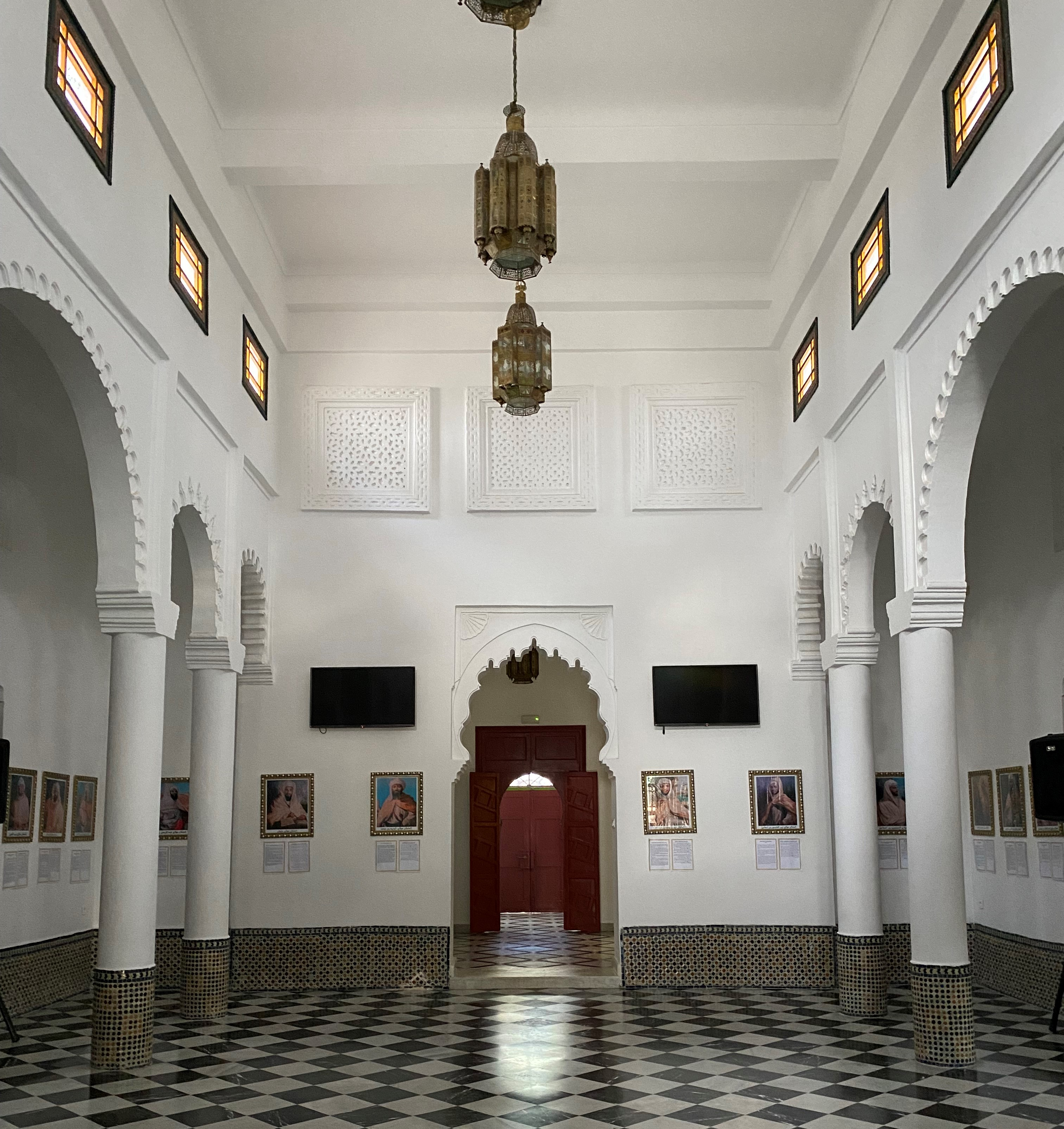
Main hall inside the Mendoubia repurposed as a memorial museum

Following Moroccan independence, the buildings that had hosted the international zone's institutions were repurposed for new uses. The Administration building became the seat of the local Prefecture (Amalat, then Wilaya), now of the region of Tanger-Tetouan-Al Hoceima. The nearby International Jurisdiction's building became the seat of Tangier's Court of First Instance, which in turn moved in 2021 to a new building in the outskirts of Tangier; the former building of the Mixed Courts was subsequently renovated. The house of the Legislative Assembly became the Marshan Palace used as a ceremonial venue by the Moroccan Monarchy. The Mendoubia became a commercial court and eventually a memorial museum of the Tangier Speech in the early 21st century.

== See also ==
- Mixed Courts of Egypt
- Concessions in China
- Free City of Cracow
- Free City of Danzig
- Panama Canal Zone
- Shanghai International Settlement
- Offshore financial centre
- Tax haven
- Bank secrecy
- American Legation, Tangier
- Perdicaris affair
- Naked Lunch

== Works cited ==
- Beevor, Antony (2006). The Battle for Spain: The Spanish Civil War 1936–1939. London: Weidenfeld & Nicolson. ISBN 0-29784832-1.
- Payne, Stanley G. (1987). The Franco Regime, 1936–1975. Madison: University of Wisconsin Press. ISBN 978-0-299-11070-3.
- Stahn, Carsten (2008). The Law and Practice of International Territorial Administration: Versailles to Iraq and Beyond. Cambridge: Cambridge University Press. ISBN 978-0-52187800-5.
- Stuart, Graham H. (July 1945). "The Future of Tangier". Foreign Affairs. 23 (4). Council on Foreign Relations: 675–679. doi:10.2307/20029932. JSTOR 20029932.
- Stuart, Graham H. (1955). The International City of Tangier (2nd ed.). Stanford: Stanford University Press.
- Haller, Dieter (2021). Tangier/Gibraltar. A Tale of one City – An Ethnography. Bielefeld: Transcript.
