= Mendoub's Residence =

Former official residence in Tangier, Morocco

Coordinates: 35°47′28.99″N 5°49′29.49″W

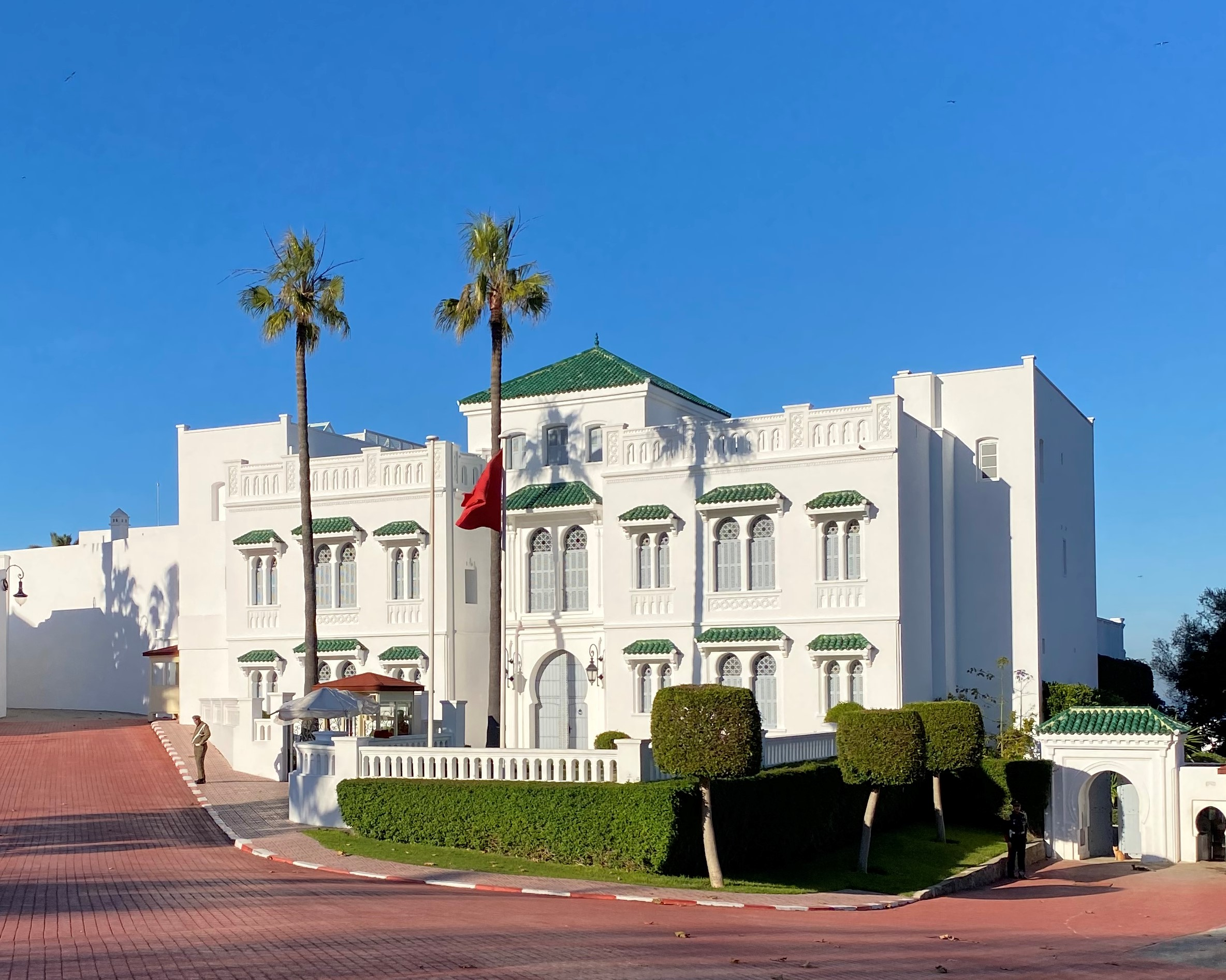
The former Mendoub's Residence in Tangier

The Mendoub's Residence or Dar al-Mandub (Arabic: قصر مندوب, French: Palais du Mendoub), formerly known as the Forbes Museum of Tangier, is a cultural monument and 10-acre (40,000 m^{2}) property located on Mohammed Tazi Street in the Marshan neighborhood of Tangier, Morocco.

== History ==
=== Residence of the Mendoub ===
The governance of the Tangier International Zone was entrusted to an administrator appointed by the colonial powers and a personal representative of the Sultan of Morocco, who from 1923 was known as the Mendoub. The main office of the Mendoub was in the former German consulate, or Mendoubia. The Mendoub Palace was built as a residence in 1929 by Mendoub Mohammed Tazi.

=== Forbes Museum ===
The property was purchased in 1970 by Malcolm Forbes, the American publisher of Forbes magazine, who converted it into a museum.

The museum had a collection of a total of 115,000 models of toy soldiers. These figures re-enacted the major battles of history; from Waterloo to Dien Bien Phû, realistically recreated with lighting and sound effects. Entire armies stood on guard in the showcases, while in the garden, 600 statuettes bear silent homage to the Battle of Three Kings. The collection contained pieces from the figurine manufacturers Britains, C.B.G. Mignot, George Heyde, Elastolin and Lineol, Barclay and Manoil. Among the many battles reenacted, the collection also contained historic events such as the funeral cortege of JFK. The toy soldiers collection was curated and built by Peter and Anne Johnson.

After the museum closed in the 1990s, 60,000 pieces of the toy soldiers collection were auctioned in December 1997 by Christie's in New York and South Kensington. Auctions went from $150 to $12,000 a set. Total sales from the auction amounted to $700,000. The Forbes Galleries in New York City today has parts of the Tangier toy soldiers collection on display.

=== Official guests residence ===
After Forbes' death in 1990, the property was put up for sale by his children and purchased by the government of Morocco, which uses it as a dependence of the Marshan Palace across the street and as a residence for official guests. For example, French President François Hollande stayed there when visiting Tangier in September 2015. It is no longer open to the public.

== In popular culture ==
The Forbes Museum was chosen for Brad Whitaker's lair for the 1987 James Bond Film The Living Daylights starring Timothy Dalton.

== See also ==
- Mendoubia
