= Spanish occupation of Tangier (1940–1945) =

Francoist occupation of the Tangier International Zone

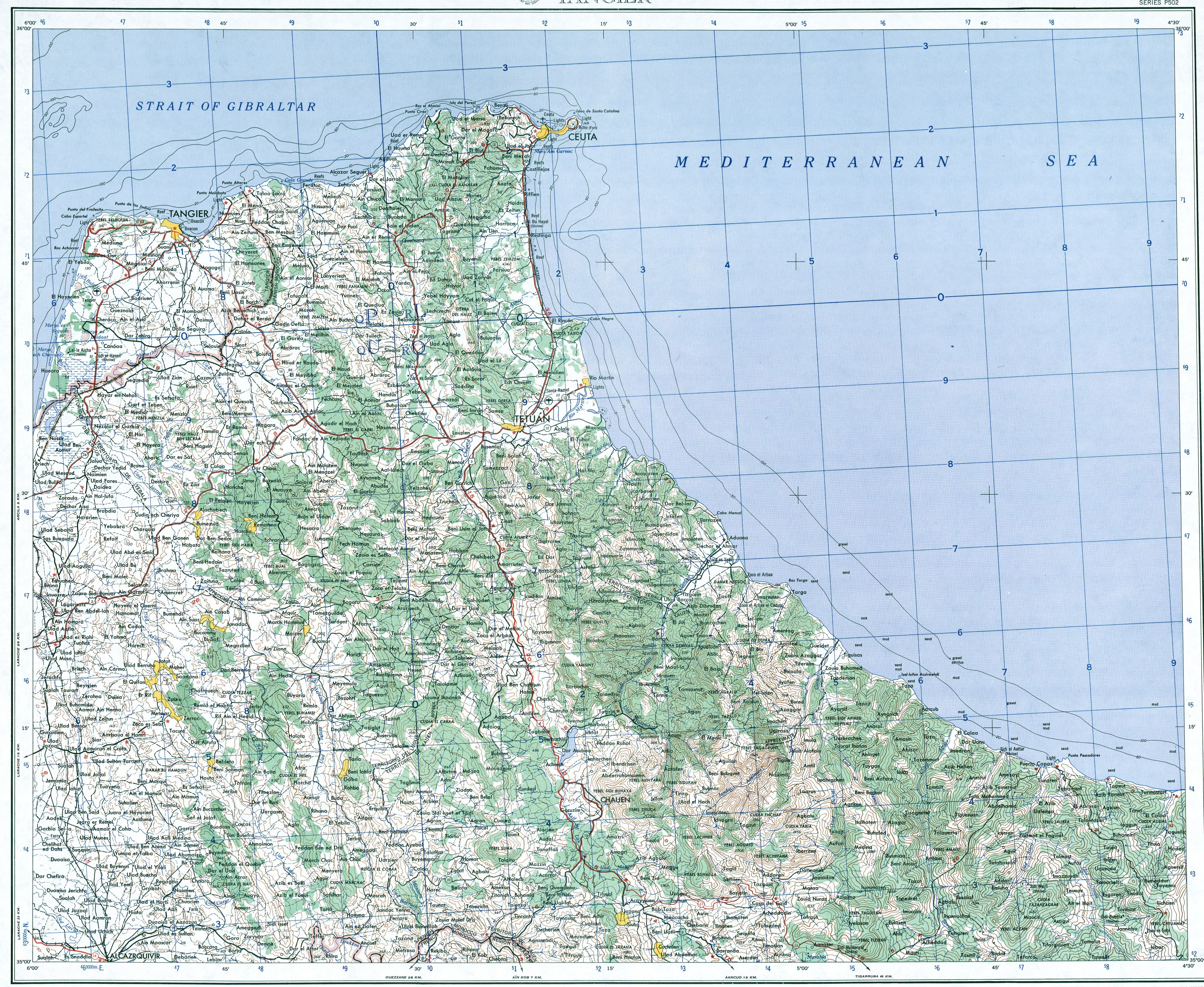
Location of the Tangier International Zone relative to Spanish Morocco before the occupation

The Spanish occupation of Tangier between 1940 and 1945 was a temporary enlargement of Spanish Morocco during World War II.

== History ==
During World War II, the Tangier International Zone was invaded and occupied by Francoist Spain.

On 14 June 1940, a few days after the Italian declaration of war after the German invasion of France, Spain seized the opportunity and, amid the collapse of the French Third Republic, a contingent of 4,000 Moorish soldiers based in the Spanish Morocco occupied the Tangier International Zone, meeting no resistance.

Despite the claim that the occupation was a "provisional" measure, the operation was the realization of a long-standing wish (Note: Already since 1912, the so-called "Liga Africanista Española" had lobbied in favour of a "Tánger para España" (transl. "Tangier for Spain").) and prelude to a potential occupation of French Morocco that did not happen because Rabat ultimately rallied to the new Vichy regime. The Mendoub, the sultan's representative, was expelled in March 1941, further undermining French influence in Tangier's affairs.

Map of Tangier and its harbour, 1936

Despite calls by the writer Rafael Sánchez Mazas and other Spanish nationalists to annex Tangier, the Franco regime publicly considered the occupation a temporary wartime measure. A diplomatic dispute between Britain and Spain over the latter's abolition of the city's international institutions in November 1940 led to a further guarantee of British rights and a Spanish promise not to fortify the area. In May 1944, although it had served as a contact point between him and the later Axis Powers during the Spanish Civil War, Franco expelled all German diplomats from the area.

Following the August 1945 Paris Conference on Tangier between the United Kingdom, France, the United States and the Soviet Union, an isolated Spain accepted the conditions lined up in the former on 19 September 1945 and retired from Tangier on 11 October 1945.

Tangier then returned to the pre-war status of an international zone.

== See also ==
- Spain during World War II
- Meeting at Hendaye (23 October 1940)
- Evacuation of the Gibraltarian civilian population during World War II (June 1940)

== Bibliography ==
- Beevor, Antony (2006) [1982]. The Battle for Spain: The Spanish Civil War 1936–1939. London: Weidenfeld & Nicolson. ISBN 0297848321.
- Dunthorn, David J. (March 2005). "The Paris Conference on Tangier, August 1945: The British Response to Soviet Interest in the 'Tangier Question'". Diplomacy and Statecraft. 16 (1). Routledge: 117–137. doi:10.1080/09592290590916167. ISSN 0959-2296. S2CID 155051496. EBSCOhost 16668530.
- Hamouda, Zeinab (July 2016). "طنجة تحت االحتالل اإلسباين (1940–1945)" [Tangier under Spanish Occupation (1940–1945)]. Ostour (in Arabic). 2 (4). Arab Center for Research and Policy Studies: 109–124. ISSN 2410-0870.
- Madariaga, María Rosa de (March 2007). "El Protectorado Español en Marruecos: algunos rasgos distintivos y su proyección en el presente". Anales de Historia Contemporánea. 23. Murcia: Universidad de Murcia: 171–182. ISSN 0212-6559.
- Payne, S.G. (1987). The Franco Regime, 1936–1975. Madison: University of Wisconsin.
- Sueiro, Susana (1994). "España en Tánger durante la Segunda Guerra Mundial: la consumación de un viejo anhelo". Espacio, Tiempo y Forma. Serie V, Historia Contemporánea (7). Madrid: Universidad Nacional de Educación a Distancia: 135–163. doi:10.5944/etfv.7.1994.3011 (inactive 26 October 2025). ISSN 1130-0124.
