= Mendoub =

Former Moroccan official title

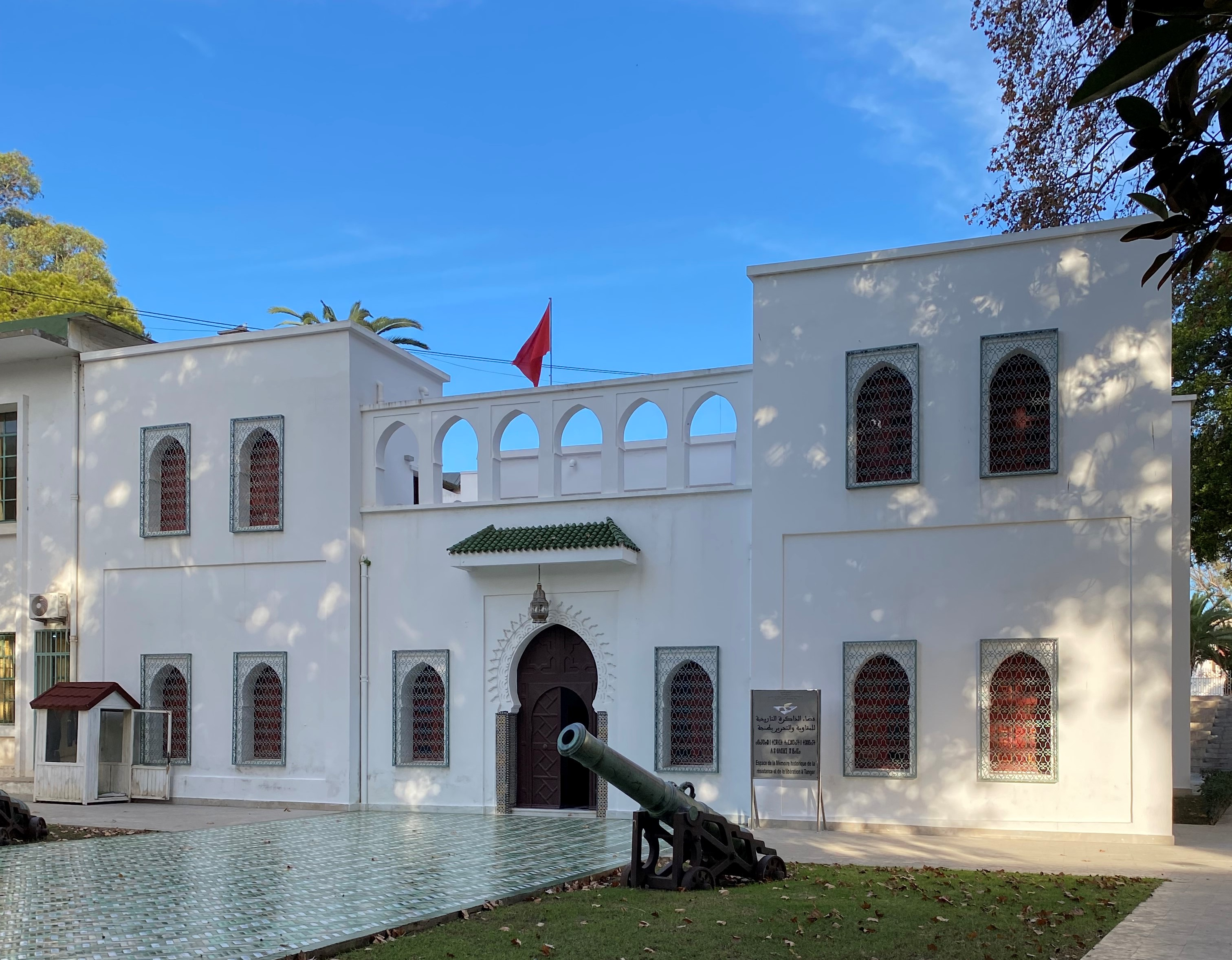
The Mendoubia, former office of the Mendoub on Tangier's Grand Socco square

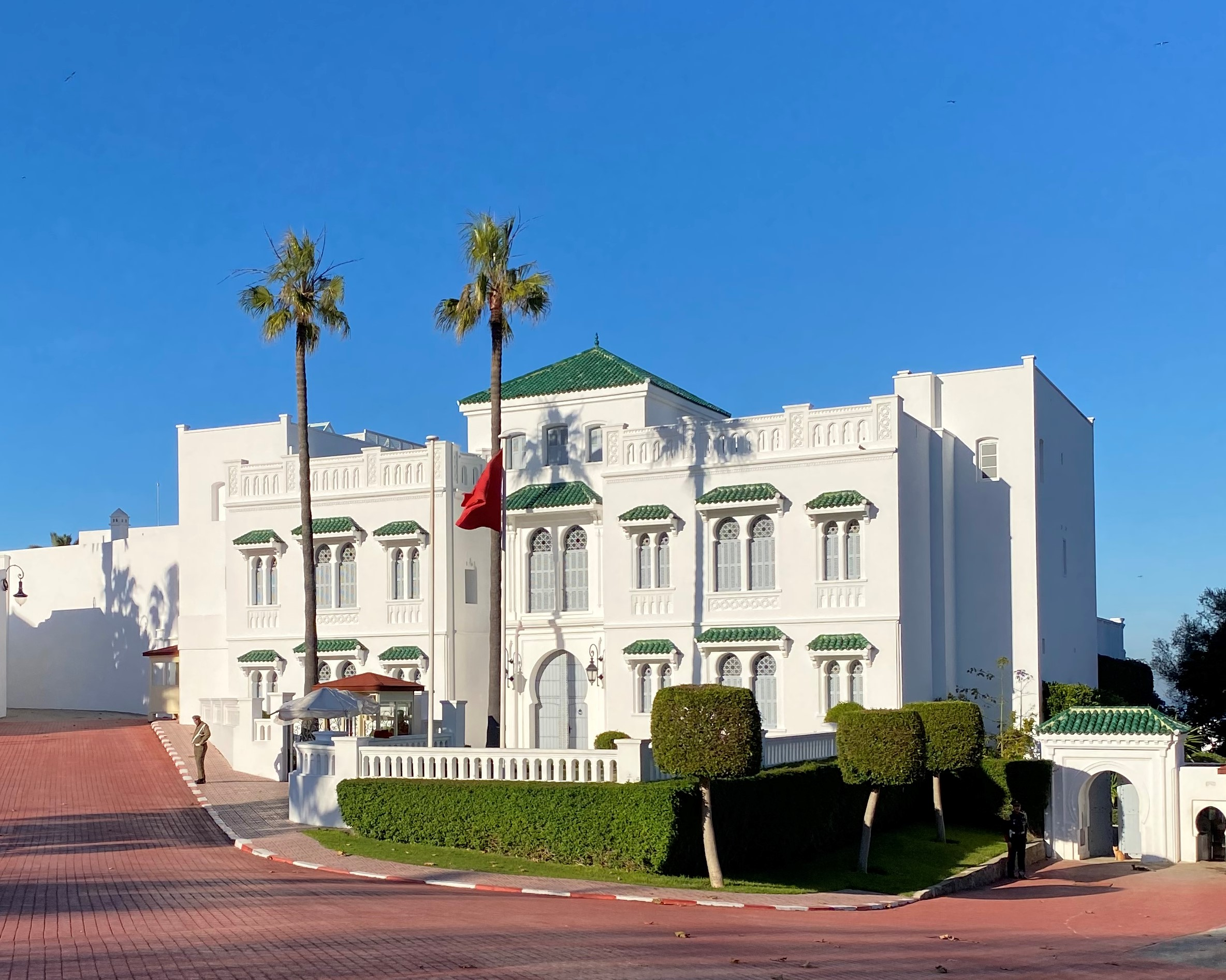
The former Mendoub's Residence in Tangier's Marshan neighborhood

The Mendoub or Mandub (Arabic: مندوب, "delegate" or "representative") was a key official in the governance of the Tangier International Zone between 1925 and 1956, with a wartime interruption from 1940 to 1945.

== Overview ==
The Mendoub represented the symbolic authority of the Sultan of Morocco in the International Zone even though its government was led by the separate Comité de Contrôle, which brought together the main foreign powers. He was directly in charge of the affairs of the Muslim and Jewish communities which together formed the vast majority of Tangier's inhabitants. He also chaired the Zone's parliamentary assembly, a largely symbolic role since he did not have a vote. His autonomy was limited by close oversight by a French official, the Contrôleur des Autorités Chérifiennes, operating under the powerful Direction des Affaires Indigènes in Rabat.

Muhammad ben Abdelkrim at-Tazi Bu Ashran was the first Mendoub from the office's creation to his death in 1954. He stayed in Rabat while the Zone fell under Spanish occupation during the Second World War. He had previously been the Naib, or Sultan's representative, to the foreign communities in Tangier, from 1913 to 1925. He was succeeded in 1954 by his son Ahmad at-Tazi, who held the role briefly until its termination in 1956.

== Properties ==
The Mendoub's ceremonial office was installed in the former German consulate building, which had been confiscated after the First World War and used by the Naib from January 1920. This property was subsequently known as the Mendoubia.

From 1929, the Mendoub resided in a palatial residence in the waterfront neighborhood of Marshan from which he proceeded to the Mendoubia in a colourful ceremonial, which became a tourist attraction.

Also in the 1920s, a suburban property was built for the Mendoub in the hills above Rmilat to the west of Tangier. It later fell into disrepair before it was eventually purchased by Katara Hospitality. It was subsequently renovated on a design by OBMI/CCCRA Architects and integrated in a hotel development opened in November 2022 as Fairmont Tazi Palace Tangier.

== See also ==
- List of rulers of the Tangier International Zone
