= Mendoubia =

Historic building in Tangier, Morocco

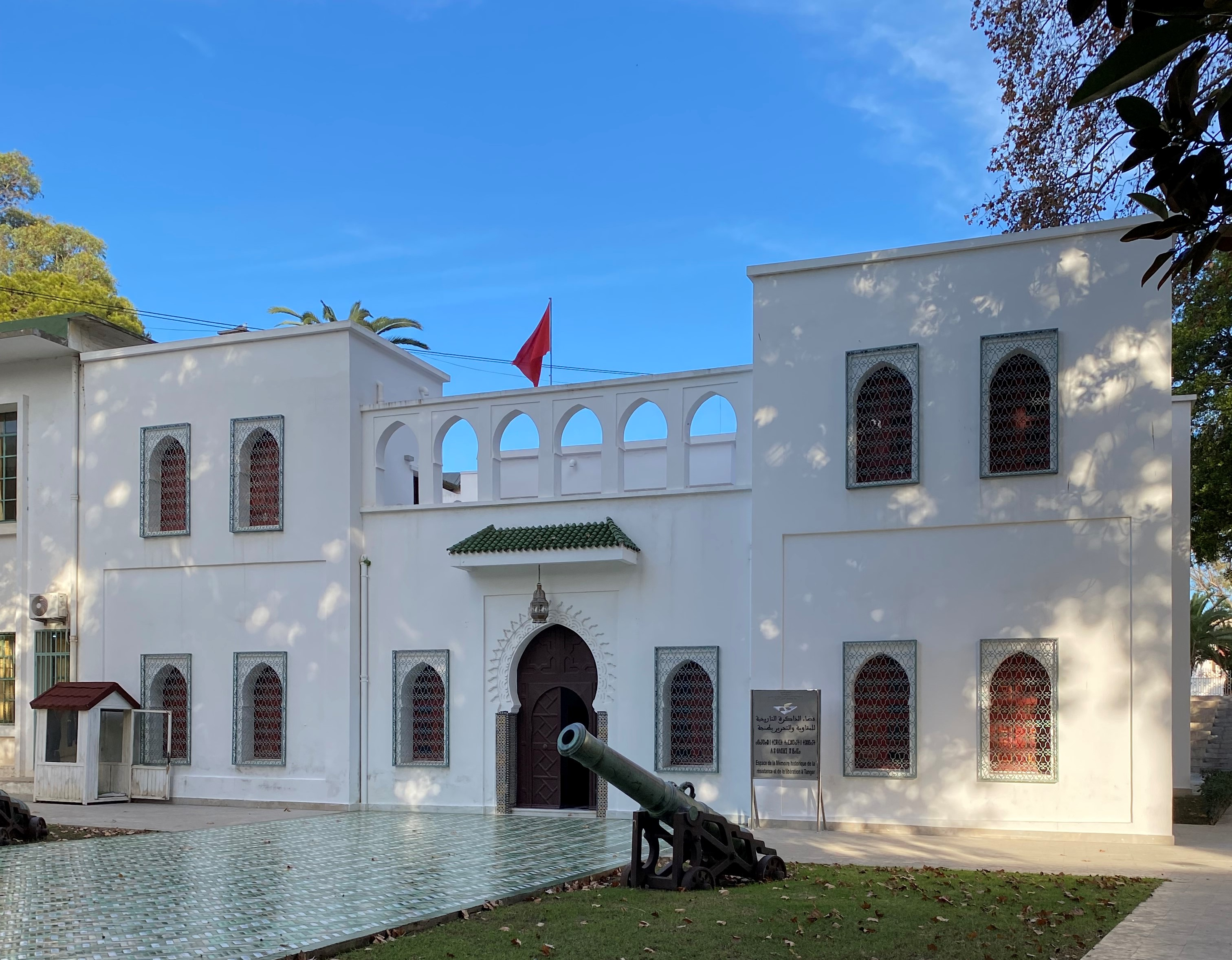
Front view of the Mendoubia, 2022

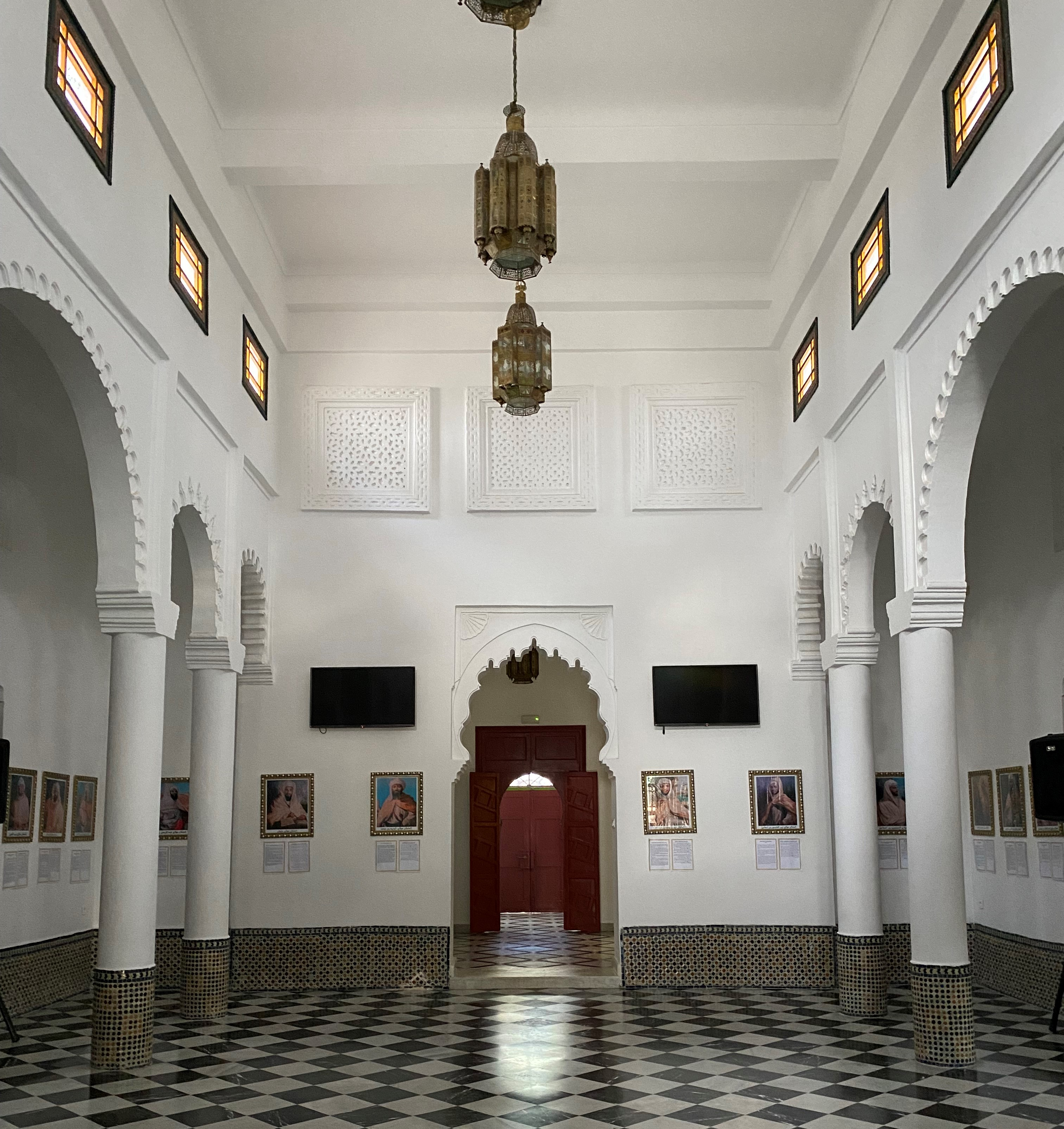
Interior hall of the Mendoubia, 2022

The Mendoubia or Mandubiyya (Arabic: المندوبية, Spanish: Mendubía) refers to the former ceremonial mansion of the Mendoub, the representative of the Sultan of Morocco in the Tangier International Zone from 1924 to 1956 (with interruption during World War II). It now houses the commercial court of Tangier and a memorial museum.

== History ==
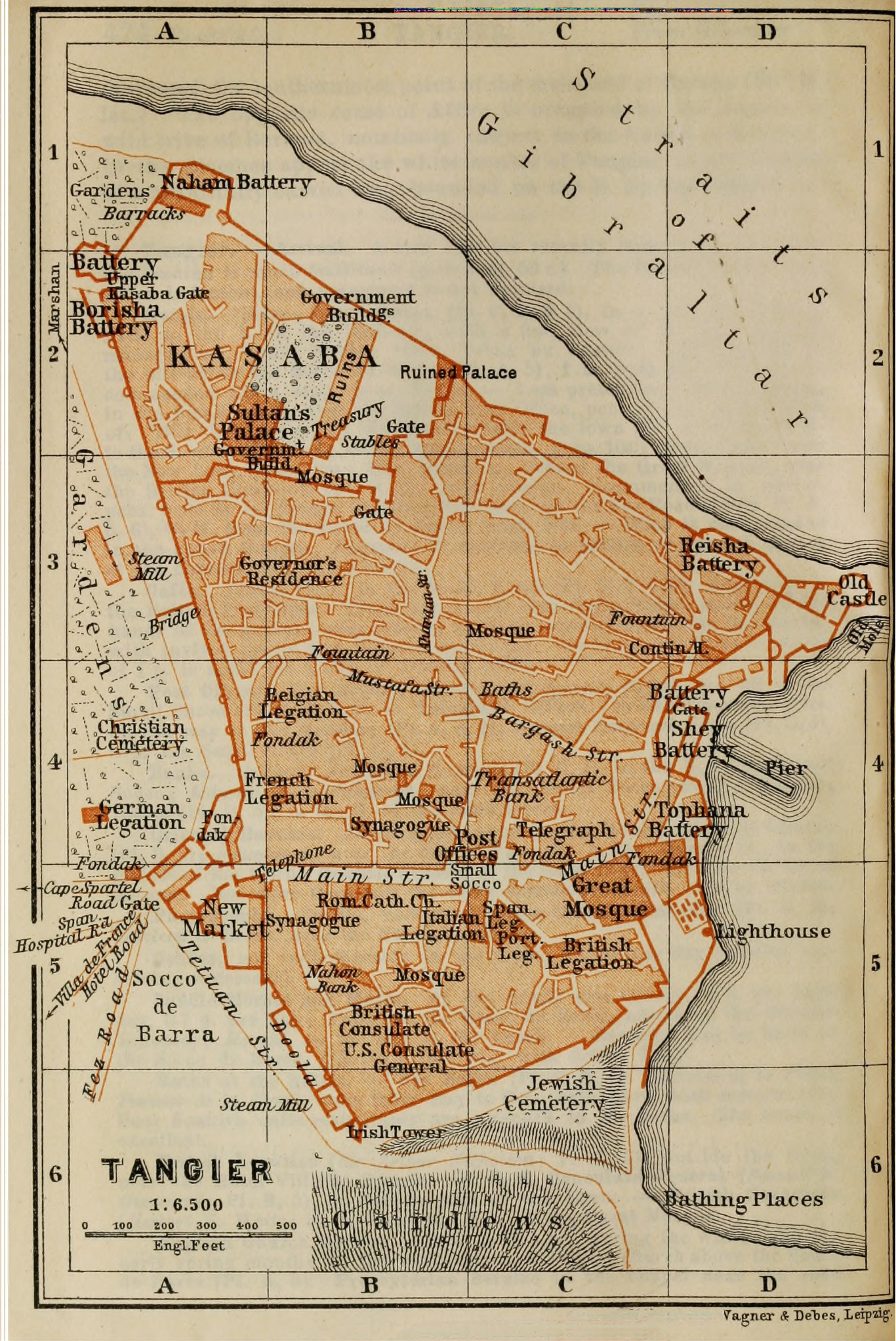
Baedeker map of Tangier in 1901, showing the German Legation (left) as a rare building outside of the walled Medina

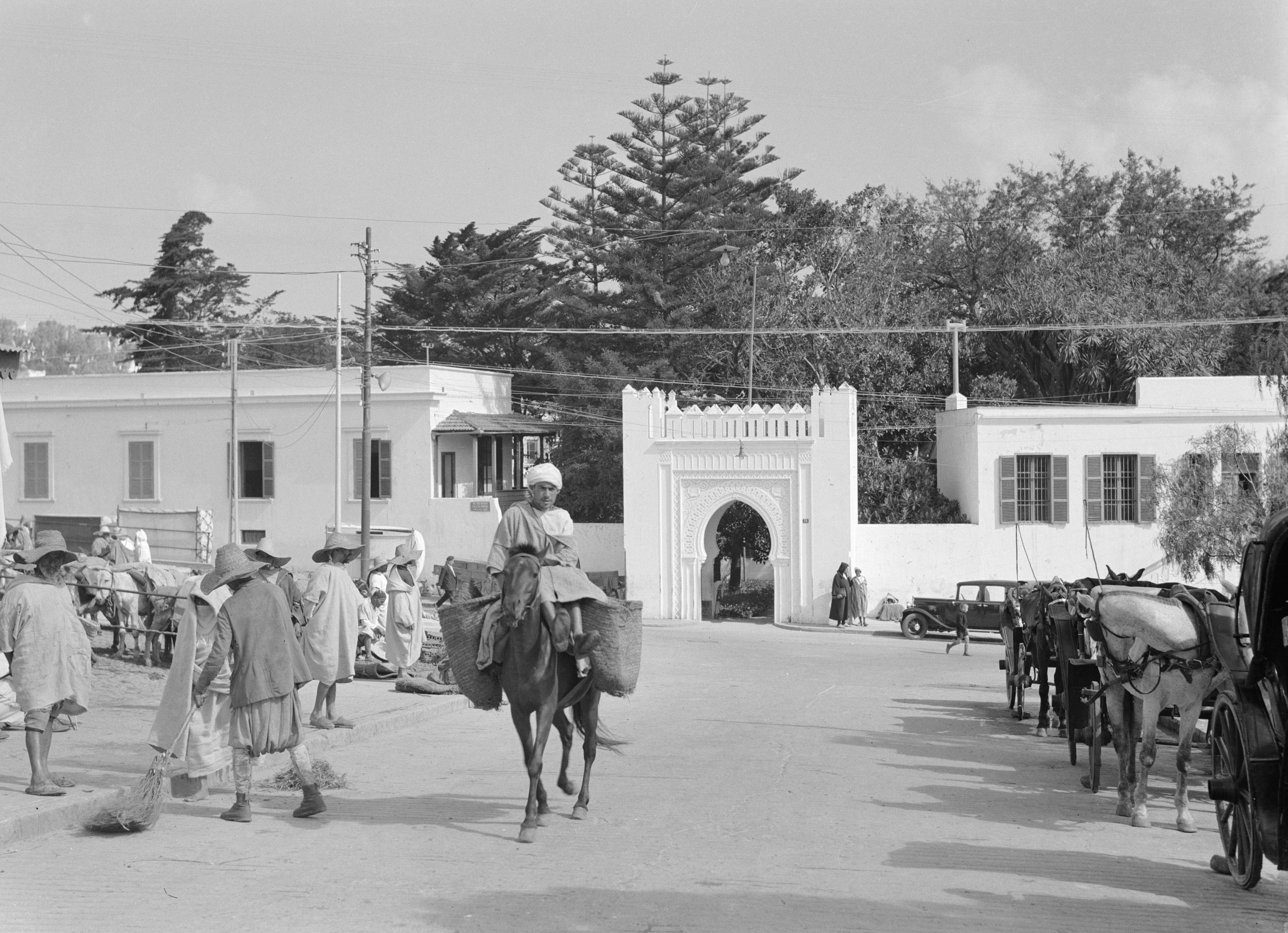
Entrance to the Mendoubia on the Grand Socco square, in 1935

In the early 19th century, the consul of Sweden in Tangier acquired a villa on the hill just outside the Medina. In 1872, the newly established German Empire decided to establish a consulate in Tangier and acquired the former Swedish legate's villa which it promptly remodeled and expanded, giving the building its current appearance. The first German consul-general, Friedrich von Gülich, arrived in 1873. In the late 19th century, it was the only European consulate outside of the walls of the Medina quarter.

That German legation was the site of Kaiser Wilhelm II’s address on 31 March 1905, supporting Moroccan independence and criticizing France’s encroachments, which triggered the First Moroccan Crisis. Less than a decade later, the German consul was expelled and expropriated by the French authorities in August 1914, at the outset of World War I.

In January 1920, the property was repurposed as ceremonial mansion of the Naib, the sultan's representative to the diplomatic corps in Tangier. From the mid-1920s, the governance of the Tangier International Zone entrusted the affairs of the Muslim and Jewish communities to a personal representative of the Sultan of Morocco known as the Mendoub, who replaced the Naib. The building thus became known as the Mendoubia.

During World War II, Tangier fell under Spanish military administration. On 16 March 1941, the Spanish authorities terminated the mandate of the Mendoub, who subsequently left the city and relocated to Rabat. The next day, diplomat Herbert Conrad Nöhring took possession of the building as Nazi Germany's consul. The German consulate remained there until 23 May 1944, when the Spanish authorities, under Allied pressure, forced it to leave. Mendoub Muhammad at-Tazi returned on board the French cruiser Duguay-Trouin on 11 October 1945.

On 9 April 1947, Mohammed V gave a landmark address on Moroccan sovereignty in the Mendoubia's gardens, which (together with another address given the next day at the Grand Mosque of Tangier) became known as the Tangier Speech. After Moroccan independence in 1956, the nearby Grand Socco was later renamed Place du 9 avril to commemorate that event.

Following the termination of the Mendoub’s office, the palace was repurposed to become the city's commercial court (French: tribunal de commerce). In the early 21st century, the main building was transformed into a memorial museum of resistance and liberation of Morocco (French: Espace de la Mémoire historique de la résistance et de la libération à Tanger), also known as Museum of the Tangier Speech (French: Musée du discours du 9 avril). The commercial court remains located in the same complex.

== Park ==
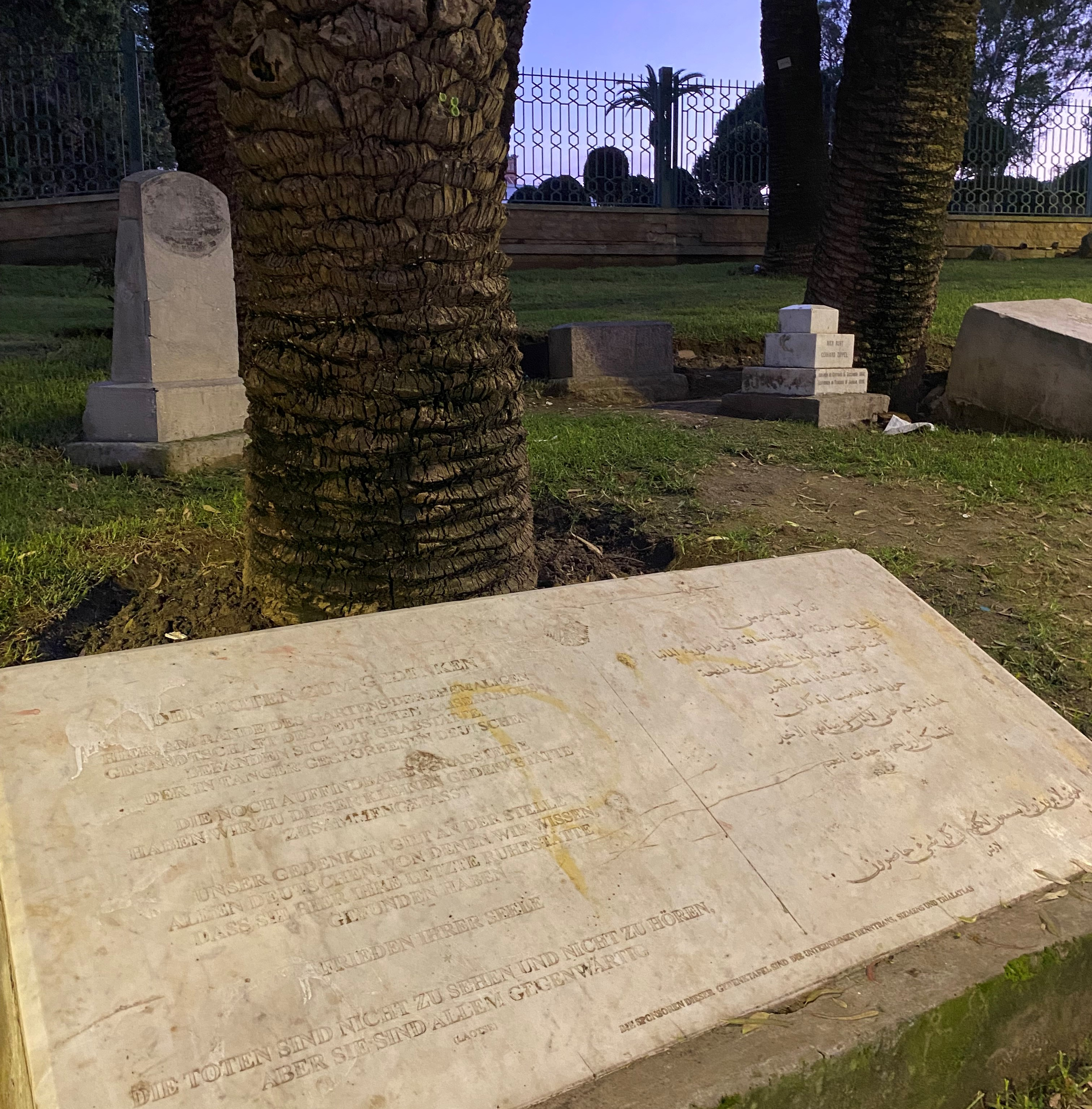
Burial monuments in the Mendoubia Park at dusk

Cemeteries were established on the Mendoubia's grounds in the 19th century, remaining in use there until 1911: a Christian / European burial ground to the north, and larger Muslim grounds to the west. In the late 2000s, Tangier governor Mohamed Hassad had these cemeteries replaced with a public park, while retaining a number of Christian funeral monuments on the northern side, and a monument that features the full text of the Tangier Speech. The grounds also include a large banyan tree, said to be 800 years old.

== See also ==
- Mendoub's Residence in the Marshan neighborhood of Tangier
- Marshan Palace, Tangier in the former building of the Tangier International Zone's Legislative Assembly, which was chaired by the Mendoub
- Royal Palace of Tétouan, former seat of the Khalifa who had similar duties in the Spanish protectorate in Morocco as the Mendoub in Tangier
