= Grand Socco =

Square in Tangier, Morocco

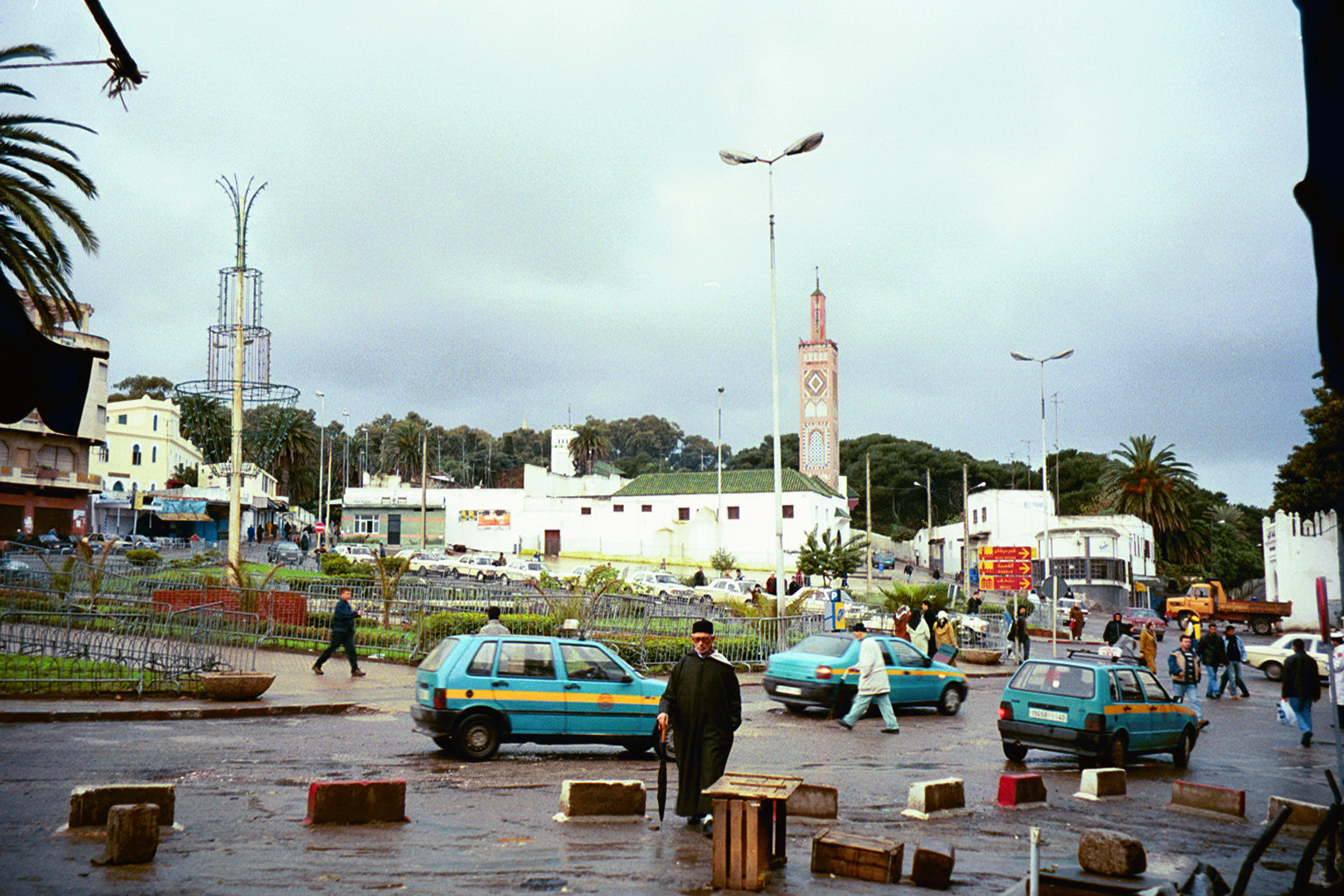
Grand Socco

The Grand Socco (Moroccan Arabic: سوق برا), officially the Place du 9 Avril 1947, is a historic quasi-circular roundabout square separating the old medina from newer developments in downtown Tangier, Morocco.

== Overview ==
The term socco is a Spanish corruption of the Arabic souk or souq. The Grand Socco is surrounded by a mosque, a few shops, several banks, half a dozen modest restaurants with covered outdoor seating areas, several cafés, the Cinema Rif, an Amendis office and a pharmacy. On one side is the arch entrance to Mendoubia Gardens and another arch leads to the Rue de la Kasbah, also known as Rue d'Italie.

The square is also known for the Tangier Speech given by Sultan Mohammed V of Morocco on 9 April 1947, from which the official French name is derived.

In the mid-1950s many large trees were cut down in the round central outdoor market. Currently, the Grand Socco has a large marble fountain in the center, surrounded by tall palm trees and small flower gardens with a dozen benches for people to sit and relax.

The square underwent further development in 2005.

== See also ==
- Sidi Bou Abid Mosque
- Petit Socco
