= List of rulers of Morocco =

This is a list of rulers of Morocco since 788. The common and formal titles of these rulers have varied over time. Since 1957, the designation King has been used.

The present King of Morocco is Mohammed VI of the Alawi dynasty, since 23 July 1999.

== Idrisid dynasty (788–974) ==
Name	Lifespan	Reign start	Reign end	Notes	Family	Image
Idris ben Abdallah (Idris I): إدريس بن عبد الله	745 – 791	788	791	First Emir of Morocco	Idrisid	
Idris ben Idris (Idris II): إدريس بن إدريس	August 791 – 828	803	828	Son of Idris ben Abdallah	Idrisid	
Muhammad ben Idris (Muhammad): محمد بن إدريس	Died 836	828	836	Son of Idris ben Idris	Idrisid	
Ali ben Muhammad (Ali I): علي بن محمد	827 – 848	836	848	Son of Muhammad ben Idris	Idrisid	
Yahya ben Muhammad (Yahya I): يحيى بن محمد	829-864	848	864	Son of Muhammad ben Idris	Idrisid	
Yahya ben Yahya (Yahya II): يحيى بن يحيى	Died 874	864	874	Son of Yahya ben Muhammad	Idrisid	
Ali ben Omar (Ali II): علي بن عمر	Died 883	874	883	Uncle of Yahya ben Muhammad	Idrisid	
Yahya ben al-Qasim (Yahya III): يحيى بن القاسم	Died 904	880	904	Cousin of Ali ben Omar	Idrisid	
Yahya ben Idris (Yahya IV): يحيى بن إدريس	Died 917	904	917	Grandson of Ali ben Omar	Idrisid	
Hassan ben Muhammad (Hassan I): الحسن بن محمد	Died 944	925	927	Nephew of Yahya ben al-Qasim	Idrisid	
Al-Qasim ben Ibrahim: القاسم بن ابراهيم	Died 948	937	948	Cousin of Hassan ben Muhammad	Idrisid	
Ahmad ibn al-Qasim: أحمد بن القاسم	Died 954	948	954	Son of Al-Qasim ben Ibrahim	Idrisid	
Hassan ben al-Qasim (Hassan II): الحسن بن القاسم	Died 985	954	974	Brother of Ahmad ibn al-Qasim	Idrisid	

== Almoravid dynasty (1040–1147) ==
Name	Lifespan	Reign start	Reign end	Notes	Family	Image
Abdallah ibn Yasin	Died 7 July 1059	1040	1059	Founder and First Almoravid Leader	Almoravid	
Abu Bakr ibn Umar	Died 1087	1056	1072	Second Almoravid Leader	Almoravid	
Yusuf ibn Tashfin	Died 1106 In Marrakesh	1072	1106	Amir Al-Muslimin	Almoravid	
Ali ibn Yusuf	1084 – 26 January 1143	1106	1143	Son of Yusuf Ibn Tashfin	Almoravid	
Tashfin ibn Ali	Died 23/25 March 1145	1143	1145	Emir of Morocco	Almoravid	
Ibrahim ibn Tashfin	Died 1147	1146	1147	Seventh Almoravid Emir	Almoravid	
Ishaq ibn Ali	Died April 1147	1147	1147	Last Almoravid Leader	Almoravid	

== Almohad dynasty (1121–1269) ==
Name	Lifespan	Reign start	Reign end	Notes	Family	Image
Ibn Tumart	1080 – 1130	1121	1139	First Almohad Leader of Morocco	Almohad	
Abd al-Mu'min	1094 – 1163	1133	1163	Member of the Almohad dynasty	Almohad	
Abu Yaqub Yusuf	1135 – 1184	1163	1184	second Almohad Emir	Almohad	
Yaqub al-Mansur	1160 – 23 January 1199	1184	1199	third Almohad Caliph	Almohad	
Muhammad al-Nasir	Died 1213	1199	1213	Fourth Almohad caliph	Almohad	
Yusuf II, Almohad caliph	1203 – 1224	1213	1224	son of Muhammad al-Nasir	Almohad	
Abd al-Wahid I	Died September 1224	February	September 1224	son of the great Almohad conqueror Abu Yaqub Yusuf	Almohad	
Abdallah al-Adil	October 4, 1227	September 1224	October 4, 1227	a former governor in al-Andalus	Almohad	
Yahya al-Mu'tasim	Died 1236	1227	1229	He was a son of Muhammad al-Nasir and brother of Yusuf II, Almohad caliph.	Almohad	
Idris al-Ma'mun	Died October 16/17, 1232	1229	1232	He was a son of Abu Yusuf Yaqub al-Mansur	Almohad	
Abd al-Wahid II	Died December 4, 1242	1232	1242	An Almohad rival caliph who reigned from 1232 until his death.	Almohad	
Abu al-Hasan as-Said al-Mutadid	Died June 1248	1242	1248	He succeeded his brother Abd al-Wahid II in a period in which the Almohads controlled only parts of present-day Morocco	Almohad	
Abu Hafs Umar al-Murtada	Died 1266	1248	1266	An Almohad caliph who reigned over part of present-day Morocco from 1248 until his death.	Almohad	
Idris al-Wathiq	Died 1269	1266	1269	An Almohad caliph who reigned in Marrakesh from 1266 until his death.	Almohad	

== Marinid dynasty (1195–1465) ==
Name	Lifespan	Reign start	Reign end	Notes	Family	Image
Abd al-Haqq I	1147 – 1217	1195	1217	First Marinid Leader of Morocco	Marinid	
Uthman ibn Abd al-Haqq	1196 – 1240	1217	1240	Sheikh of Morocco	Marinid	
Muhammad ibn Abd Al-Haqq	1202 – 1244	1240	1244	Sheikh of Morocco	Marinid	
Abu Yahya ibn Abd al-Haqq	Died 1258	1244	1258	Emir of Morocco	Marinid	
Abu Yusuf Yaqub ibn Abd al-Haqq	20 March 1286	1258	1286	First Marinid Sultan of Morocco	Marinid	
Abu Yaqub Yusuf an-Nasr	Died 13 May 1307	March 1286	13 May 1307	son of Abu Yusuf Yaqub ibn Abd al-Haqq	Marinid	
Abu Thabit 'Amir	1284 – 1308	May 1307	July 1308	Son of Abu Yaqub Yusuf an-Nasr	Marinid	
Abu al-Rabi Sulayman	March 1289 – 23 November 1310	1308	1310	Son or grandson of Abu Yaqub Yusuf	Marinid	
Abu Sa'id Uthman II	December 1276 – August 1331	November 1310	August 1331	Son of Abu Yaqub Yusuf al-Nasr	Marinid	
Abu al-Hasan Ali ibn Othman	1297 – 1351	August 1331	1348	Son of Abu Sa'id Uthman II	Marinid	
Abu Inan Faris	1329 – 10 January 1358	1348	1358	Son of Abu al-Hasan Ali ibn Othman	Marinid	
Abu Bakr ibn Faris	Died 1359	1358	1359	Sultan of Morocco	Marinid	
Ibrahim ibn Ali	1335 – 1361	1359	1361	Sultan of Morocco	Marinid	
Tashfin ibn Ali	1329 – 1362	1361	1362	Sultan of Morocco	Marinid	
Muhammad II ibn Faris	1338 – 1366	1362	1366	Sultan of Morocco	Marinid	
Abu Faris Abd al-Aziz I	1349 – 1372	1366	1372	Sultan of Morocco	Marinid	
Muhammad III ibn Abd al-Aziz	1368 – 1374	1372	1374	Son of Abu Faris Abd al-Aziz I of Morocco	Marinid	
Abu al-Abbas Ahmad al-Mustansir	Died 1393	1374	1393	son of Abu Faris Abd al-Aziz I of Morocco	Marinid	
Musa ibn Faris al-Mutawakkil	Died 1386	1384	1386	Disabled son of the former Sultan Abu Inan Faris	Marinid	
Muhammad ibn Ahmad al-Wathiq	Died 1387	1386	1387	Ruled Morocco for only a year	Marinid	
Abd al-Aziz II ibn Ahmad II	1375 – 1396	1394	1396	Sultan of Morocco	Marinid	
Abdallah ibn Ahmad II	1378 – 1398	1396	1398	Abdul Aziz II succeeded his brother Abu Faris Abdul Aziz II	Marinid	
Abu Said Uthman III	1383 – 21 October 1420	19 March 1398	21 October 1420	He succeeded his brother, Abu Amir Abdallah ibn Ahmad.	Marinid	
Abd al-Haqq II	1419 – 14 August 1465	October 1420	14 August 1465	Last Marinid Ruler of Morocco	Marinid	

== Idrisid interlude (1465–1471) ==
- Muhammad ibn Ali Idrisi-Joutey (1465–1471)

== Wattasid dynasty (1472–1554) ==
Name	Lifespan	Reign start	Reign end	Notes	Family	Image
Abu Abd Allah al-Sheikh Muhammad ibn Yahya	1472 – 1504 (aged 32)	1472	1504	First Wattasid Sultan of Morocco	Wattasid	
Abu Abd Allah al-Burtuqali Muhammad ibn Muhammad	1464 – 1536 (aged 72)	1504	1526	Son of Abu Abd Allah al-Sheikh Muhammad ibn Yahya	Wattasid	Muhammad al-Burtuqali
Abu al-Abbas Ahmad ibn Muhammad	Died 1549	1526	1545	Third Wattasid Sultan of Morocco	Wattasid	
Nasir ad-Din al-Qasri Muhammad ibn Ahmad	Died 1547	1545	1547	Fourth Wattasid Sultan of Morocco	Wattasid	
Ali Abu Hassun	Died September 1554	1549	1554	Fifth Wattasid Sultan Of Morocco	Wattasid	

== Saadi dynasty (1544–1659) ==
Name	Lifespan	Reign start	Reign end	Notes	Family	Image
Mohammed al-Shaykh: محمد الشيخ	1490 – 23 October 1557 (aged 67)	1544	23 October 1557 (Assassinated)	Brother of Ahmed Al-Araj Al-Saadi	Saadi	
Abdallah al-Ghalib: عبد الله الغالب	1517 – 22 January 1574 (aged 57)	1557	1574	Son of Mohammed ash-Sheikh	Saadi	
Abu Abdallah Mohammed II: أبو عبد الله محمد	Died 4 August 1578	1574	1576 (Deposed)	Son of Abdallah al-Ghalib	Saadi	
Abu Marwan Abd al-Malik I: عبد الملك الأول	Died 4 August 1578	1576	1578 (Deposed)	Son of Mohammed ash-Sheikh	Saadi	Abu Marwan Abd al-Malik I
Ahmad al-Mansur: أحمد المنصور	1549 – 25 August 1603 (aged 54)	1578	1603	Son of Mohammed ash-Sheikh	Saadi	Ahmad al-Mansur
Abu Faris Abdallah; Ruled from Marrakesh: أبو فارس عبد الله	1564 – 1608 (aged 44)	1603	1608	Son of Ahmad al-Mansur	Saadi	
Mohammed esh-Sheikh el-Mamun; Ruled from Fes: محمد الشيخ المأمون	1566 – 1613 (aged 47)	1603	1613	Son of Ahmad al-Mansur	Saadi	
Zidan el-Nasir; Ruled from Marrakesh: زيدان الناصر	Died September 1627	1603	1627	Son of Ahmad al-Mansur	Saadi	
Abdallah al-Ghalib II; Ruled from Fes: عبد الله الغالب	Died 1623	1606	1623 (Deposed)	Son of Mohammed esh-Sheikh el-Mamun	Saadi	
Abd al-Malik ibn Abdallah; Ruled from Fes: عبد الملك بن عبد الله	Died 1627	1623	February 1627 (Deposed)	Son of Abdallah al-Ghalib II	Saadi	
Abu Marwan Abd al-Malik II: أبو مروان عبد الملك	Died 1631	1627	1631 (Assassinated)	Son of Zidan el-Nasir	Saadi	
Al Walid bin Zidan: الوليد بن زيدان	Died 1636	1631	1636 (Assassinated)	Son of Zidan el-Nasir	Saadi	
Mohammed esh-Sheikh es-Seghir: محمد الشيخ الصغير	Died 30 January 1655	1636	1655 (Assassinated)	Son of Zidan el-Nasir	Saadi	Mohammed esh-Sheikh es-Seghir
Ahmad al-Abbas: أحمد العباس	Died 1659	1655	1659 (Assassinated)	Son of Mohammed esh-Sheikh es-Seghir	Saadi	

== Dila'i interlude (1659–1663) ==
- Muhammad al-Hajj ad-Dila'i (1659–1663)

== Alawi dynasty (1631–present) ==
1631–1957: Sultans of Morocco

Name	Lifespan	Reign start	Reign end	Notes	Family	Image
Sharif ibn Ali: الشريف بن علي	1589 – 4 June 1659 (aged 70)	1631	1636	First 'Alawi sultan of Morocco	Alawi	
Muhammad ibn Sharif; Muhammad I: محمد بن الشريف	1630 – 2 August 1664 (aged 34)	1636	2 August 1664 (Killed in battle)	Son of Sharif ibn Ali	Alawi	
Al-Rashid bin Sharif: الرشيد بن الشريف	1631 – 9 April 1672 (aged 41)	1666	9 April 1672	Son of Sharif ibn Ali	Alawi	Al-Rashid of Morocco
Ismail bin Sharif: إسماعيل بن الشريف	1645 – 22 March 1727 (aged 82)	1672	22 March 1727	Son of Sharif ibn Ali	Alawi	Ismail Ibn Sharif of Morocco
Ahmad bin Ismail (1st reign): أحمد بن إسماعيل	1677 – 5 March 1729 (aged 52)	22 March 1727	March 1728 (deposed)	Son of Ismail Ibn Sharif	Alawi	
Abd al-Malik bin Ismail: عبد الملك بن إسماعيل	1696 – 2 March 1729 (aged 33)	March 1728	July 1728 (deposed)	Son of Ismail Ibn Sharif	Alawi	
Ahmad bin Ismail (2nd reign): أحمد بن إسماعيل	1677 – 5 March 1729 (aged 52)	July 1728	5 March 1729	Son of Ismail Ibn Sharif	Alawi	
Abdallah bin Ismail (1st reign): عبد الله بن إسماعيل	1694 – 10 November 1757 (aged 63)	5 March 1729	28 September 1734 (deposed)	Son of Ismail Ibn Sharif	Alawi	Abdallah of Morocco
Ali bin Ismail: علي بن إسماعيل	Died April 1737	28 September 1734	14 February 1736 (deposed)	Son of Ismail Ibn Sharif	Alawi	
Abdallah bin Ismail (2nd reign): عبد الله بن إسماعيل	1694 – 10 November 1757 (aged 63)	14 February 1736	8 August 1736 (deposed)	Son of Ismail Ibn Sharif	Alawi	Abdallah of Morocco
Muhammad bin Ismail (Muhammad II): محمد بن إسماعيل	1694 – 1739	8 August 1736	18 June 1738 (deposed)	Son of Ismail Ibn Sharif	Alawi	
Al-Mostadi bin Ismail (1st reign): المستضيء بن إسماعيل	Died 1759	18 June 1738	February 1740 (deposed)	Son of Ismail Ibn Sharif	Alawi	
Abdallah bin Ismail (3rd reign): عبد الله بن إسماعيل	1694 – 10 November 1757 (aged 63)	February 1740	13 June 1741 (deposed)	Son of Ismail Ibn Sharif	Alawi	Abdallah of Morocco
Zin al-Abidin bin Ismail: زين العابدين بن إسماعيل	1692 – 1762 (aged 70)	13 June 1741	24 November 1741 (deposed)	Son of Ismail Ibn Sharif	Alawi	
Abdallah bin Ismail (4th reign): عبد الله بن إسماعيل	1694 – 10 November 1757 (aged 63)	24 November 1741	3 February 1742 (deposed)	Son of Ismail Ibn Sharif	Alawi	Abdallah of Morocco
Al-Mostadi bin Ismail (2nd reign): المستضيء بن إسماعيل	Died 1759	3 February 1742	May 1743 (deposed)	Son of Ismail Ibn Sharif	Alawi	
Abdallah bin Ismail (5th reign): عبد الله بن إسماعيل	1694 – 10 November 1757 (aged 63)	May 1743	July 1747 (deposed)	Son of Ismail Ibn Sharif	Alawi	Abdallah of Morocco
Al-Mostadi bin Ismail (3rd reign): المستضيء بن إسماعيل	Died 1759	July 1747	October 1748 (deposed)	Son of Ismail Ibn Sharif	Alawi	
Abdallah bin Ismail (6th reign): عبد الله بن إسماعيل	1694 – 10 November 1757 (aged 63)	October 1748	10 November 1757	Son of Ismail Ibn Sharif	Alawi	Abdallah of Morocco
Muhammad bin Abdallah (Muhammad III): محمد بن عبد الله	1710 – 9 April 1790 (aged 80)	10 November 1757	9 April 1790	Son of Abdallah	Alawi	
Yazid bin Muhammad: اليزيد بن محمد	6 May 1750 – 23 February 1792 (aged 41)	9 April 1790	23 February 1792	Son of Muhmammad bin Abdallah	Alawi	
Sulayman bin Muhammad: سليمان بن محمد	28 June 1766 – 28 November 1822 (aged 56)	23 February 1792	28 November 1822	Son of Muhammad bin Abdallah	Alawi	Sulayman of Morocco
Abd al-Rahman bin Hisham: عبد الرحمن بن هشام	19 February 1778 – 28 August 1859 (aged 81)	30 November 1822	28 August 1859	Nephew of Sulayman bin Muhammad	Alawi	Abd al-Rahman of Morocco
Muhammad bin Abd al-Rahman (Muhammad IV): محمد بن عبد الرحمن	1803 – 16 September 1873 (aged 70)	28 August 1859	16 September 1873	Son of Abd al-Rahman bin Hisham	Alawi	Muhammad IV of Morocco
Hassan bin Mohammed (Hassan I): الحسن بن محمد	1836 – 9 June 1894 (aged 58)	16 September 1873	9 June 1894	Son of Muhammad bin Abd al-Rahman	Alawi	Hassan I of Morocco
Abd al-Aziz bin Hassan: عبد العزيز بن الحسن	24 February 1878 – 10 June 1943 (aged 65)	9 June 1894	21 August 1908 (deposed)	Son of Hassan bin Muhammad	Alawi	Abd al-Aziz of Morocco
Abd al-Hafid bin Hassan: عبد الحفيظ بن الحسن	24 February 1876 – 4 April 1937 (aged 61)	21 August 1908	30 March 1912 (abdicated)	Son of Hassan bin Muhammad	Alawi	Abd al-Hafid of Morocco
Yusef bin Hassan: يوسف بن الحسن	1882 – 17 November 1927 (aged 45)	30 March 1912	17 November 1927	Son of Hassan bin Muhammad	Alawi	Yusef of Morocco
Muhammad bin Yusef (Muhammad V) (1st reign): محمد بن يوسف	10 August 1909 – 26 February 1961 (aged 51)	17 November 1927	20 August 1953 (deposed)	Son of Yusef bin Hassan	Alawi	Mohammed V of Morocco
Mohammed bin Arafa (Title not recognised by the Moroccan state): محمد بن عرفة	1886 – 17 July 1976 (aged 90)	21 August 1953	1 October 1955 (abdicated)	Grandson of Muhammad bin Abd al-Rahman	Alawi	Mohammed Ben Aarafa of Morocco
Muhammad bin Yusef (Muhammad V) (2nd reign): محمد بن يوسف	10 August 1909 – 26 February 1961 (aged 51)	30 October 1955	14 August 1957 (proclaimed King of Morocco)	Son of Yusef bin Hassan	Alawi	Mohammed V of Morocco

1957–present: Kings of Morocco

Name	Lifespan	Reign start	Reign end	Notes	Family	Image
Muhammad bin Yusef (Muhammad V): محمد بن يوسف	10 August 1909 – 26 February 1961 (aged 51)	14 August 1957	26 February 1961	Son of Yusef bin Hassan	Alawi	Mohammed V of Morocco
Hassan bin Muhammad (Hassan II): الحسن بن محمد	9 July 1929 – 23 July 1999 (aged 70)	26 February 1961	23 July 1999	Son of Muhammad bin Yusef	Alawi	Hassan II of Morocco
Muhammad bin Hassan (Muhammad VI): محمد بن الحسن	21 August 1963 (age 63)	23 July 1999	Incumbent	Son of Hassan bin Muhammad	Alawi	Mohammed VI of Morocco

== Royal standard ==
Royal standard of Morocco

== See also ==
- Succession to the Moroccan throne
- History of Morocco
- Politics of Morocco
