= Ali ibn Muhammad bin Idris =

Idrisid ruler from 836 to 849

Ali I علي الأول
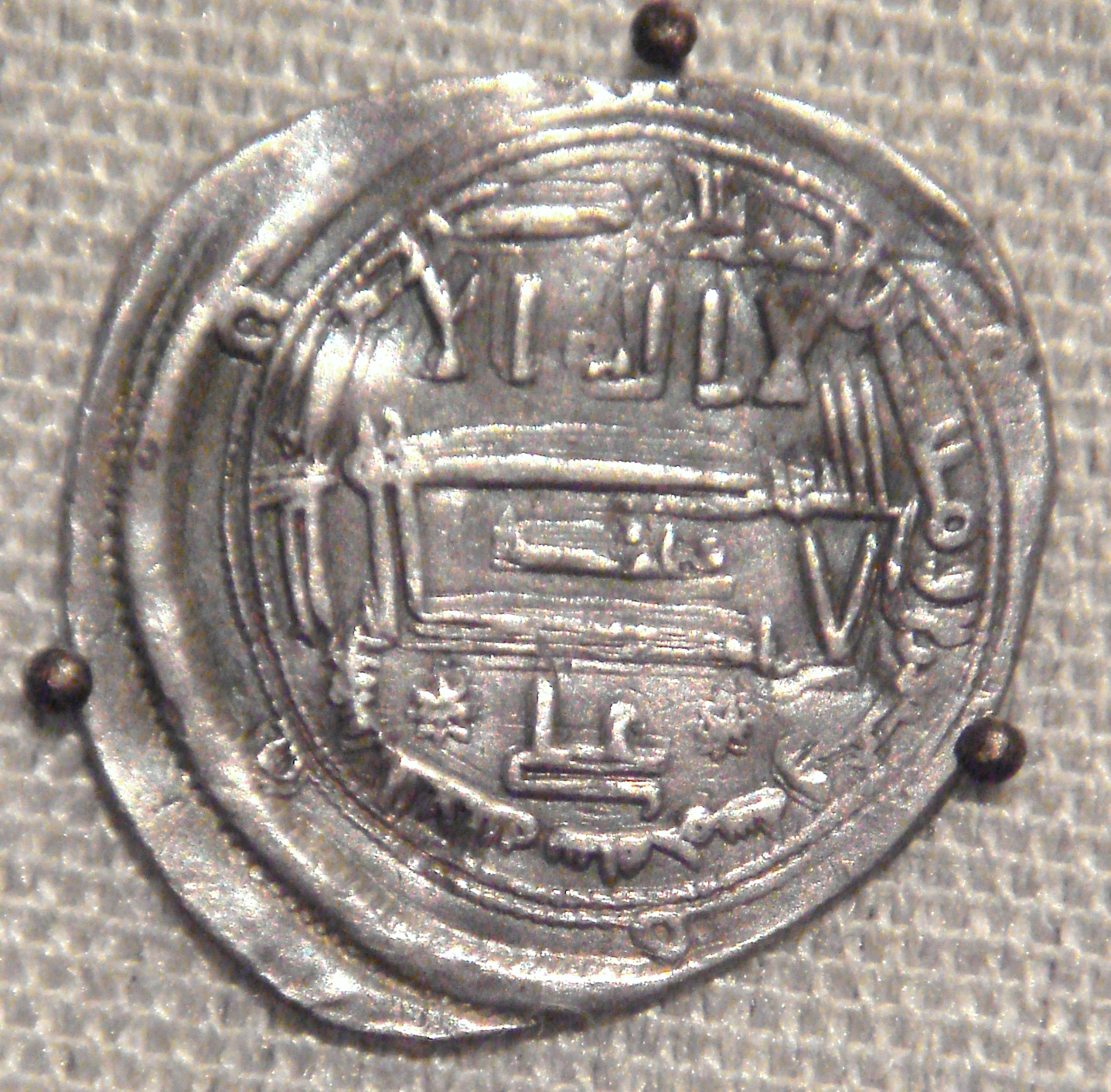
- Dirham, minted at al-Aliyah (Fes) during the reign of Ali bin Muhammad, in 840 CE

Emir
- Reign: 836 – 849
- Predecessor: Muhammad bin Idris
- Successor: Yahya ibn Muhammad
- Born: 827
- Died: 849
Names
- Ali Haidara bin Muhammad
- Dynasty: Idrisid
- Father: Muhammad bin Idris
- Mother: Roqiya bint Ismail al-Azadi
- Religion: Islam

Ali bin Muhammad bin Idris (Arabic: علي بن محمد بن إدريس) was the fourth Idrisid ruler.

== Life ==
Ali was the son of Muhammad ibn Idris, whom he succeeded in March/April 836 at the age of nine. During his infancy, the chieftains of the Berber tribes acted as his regents. He proved an able ruler, who managed to stabilize and pacify the Idrisid realm after the troubled reign of his father. During his reign, Idrisid authority was strengthened and stretched from Basra to Tudgha. Some Idrisid troops reportedly also participated in the 846 Sack of Rome by Aghlabid raiders.

Ali died in January 849 at Fes and was succeeded by his brother Yahya I.

== Sources ==
- Benchekroun, Chafik T. (2018). "Idrīsids". In Fleet, Kate; Krämer, Gudrun; Matringe, Denis; Nawas, John; Rowson, Everett (eds.). Encyclopaedia of Islam (3rd ed.). Brill Online. doi:10.1163/1573-3912_ei3_COM_32374. ISSN 1873-9830.
- Eustache, D. (1971). "Idrīsids". In Lewis, B.; Ménage, V. L.; Pellat, Ch. & Schacht, J. (eds.). The Encyclopaedia of Islam, Second Edition. Volume III: H–Iram. Leiden: E. J. Brill. pp. 1035–1037. doi:10.1163/1573-3912_islam_SIM_3495. OCLC 495469525.

Preceded by Muhammad	Idrisid emir 836–849	Succeeded by Yahya I
