= Ali ibn Umar =

Idrisid ruler

Ali II علي الثاني

Emir
- Reign: 866–unknown
- Predecessor: Yahya II ibn Yahya
- Successor: Yahya III or Dawud
Names
- Ali ibn Umar
- Dynasty: Idrisid
- Father: Umar ibn Idris
- Religion: Islam

Ali ibn Umar (Arabic: علي بن عمر) was the seventh Idrisid ruler.

== Life ==
Ali was a son of Umar, a younger son of the second Idrisid ruler, Idris II (r. 808–828). Upon the death of Idris II, his father, Umar ibn Idris, had received rule over the Sanhaja and of the Ghumara Berbers, and was later rewarded with rule over Tangier for suppressing the revolts of two of his brothers, al-Qasim and Isa. Umar died in September/October 835, and Ali was confirmed in full possession of his father's domains by Emir Muhammad ibn Idris.

One of his daughters married his great-nephew, the sixth Idrisid emir, Yahya ibn Yahya. Yahya died in uncertain circumstances in 866, whereupon a powerful citizen of the capital, Fes, Abd al-Rahman ibn Abi Sahl al-Judhami—whose family apparently already disputed rule of the city with Yahya's father—tried to seize power. Yahya's widow called upon her father for aid, and Ali succeeded in gaining control of Fes.

At an unknown date during Ali's rule, a Sufri Kharijite leader, Abd al-Razzaq, launched a revolt in the mountains south of the capital. The rebellion spread, and Ali was forced to abandon Fes and flee to the Awraba Berbers. Abd al-Razzaq was unable to take all of Fes, however, as the Qarawiyyin quarter on the left bank of the Fes river resisted him, and called upon Yahya ibn al-Qasim, Ali's paternal cousin, for aid. Yahya managed to drive the rebels away, although his control over Fes was intermittent, and was challenged by a different branch of the Idrisid family, the descendants of his uncle, Isa ibn Idris. In addition, in c. 877, another uncle, Dawud is attested as the ruler of Fes, based on an inscription at the al-Qarawiyyin mosque.

== Sources ==
- Benchekroun, Chafik T. (2018). "Idrīsids". In Fleet, Kate; Krämer, Gudrun; Matringe, Denis; Nawas, John; Rowson, Everett (eds.). Encyclopaedia of Islam (3rd ed.). Brill Online. doi:10.1163/1573-3912_ei3_COM_32374. ISSN 1873-9830.
- Eustache, D. (1971). "Idrīsids". In Lewis, B.; Ménage, V. L.; Pellat, Ch. & Schacht, J. (eds.). The Encyclopaedia of Islam, Second Edition. Volume III: H–Iram. Leiden: E. J. Brill. pp. 1035–1037. doi:10.1163/1573-3912_islam_SIM_3495. OCLC 495469525.

Preceded by Yahya II	Idrisid emir 866–unknown	Succeeded by Yahya III or Dawud
