= Al-Qasim ibn Idris =

9th-century Idrisid prince of Morocca

Al-Qasim ibn Idris was an Idrisid prince and ruler in parts of present-day Morocco during the 9th century.

== Life ==
Al-Qasim was a younger son of the second Idrisid ruler Idris II (r. 808–828). Upon the death of Idris II, al-Qasim's oldest brother Muhammad succeeded to the throne, but divided much of the country among his younger brothers. Thus al-Qasim received rule over Tangier and Basra in the north.

When another brother, Isa, rose in revolt, al-Qasim refused to support Muhammad and was attacked and deprived of his domains by another brother, Umar. Al-Qasim outlived his brother and the latter's sons, and in the reign of his great-nephew, Yahya II (r. 863–866), his family received governance of the western half of the Idrisid capital, Fes, along with the eastern frontier provinces of the Berber tribes of Luwata and Kutama.

Towards the end of the 9th century, the family of al-Qasim remained in control of northern Morocco (Tangier, Basra, Ceuta), and his son, Yahya III, ruled over Fes for a while after evicting the Kharijite rebel Abd al-Razzaq from the city. The last Idrisid rulers all descended from al-Qasim via his son Muhammad.

== Sources ==
- Benchekroun, Chafik T. (2018). "Idrīsids". In Fleet, Kate; Krämer, Gudrun; Matringe, Denis; Nawas, John; Rowson, Everett (eds.). Encyclopaedia of Islam (3rd ed.). Brill Online. doi:10.1163/1573-3912_ei3_COM_32374. ISSN 1873-9830.
- Eustache, D. (1971). "Idrīsids". In Lewis, B.; Ménage, V. L.; Pellat, Ch. & Schacht, J. (eds.). The Encyclopaedia of Islam, Second Edition. Volume III: H–Iram. Leiden: E. J. Brill. pp. 1035–1037. doi:10.1163/1573-3912_islam_SIM_3495. OCLC 495469525.
