= Yahya ibn Idris ibn Umar =

Idrisid Emir from 905 to 922

Yahya IV يحيى الرابع

Emir
- Reign: 905–922
- Predecessor: Yahya III
- Successor: Position abolished (annexed to the Fatimid Caliphate)
- Died: 946 al-Mahdiya
Names
- Yahya ibn Idris ibn Umar
- Dynasty: Idrisid
- Father: Idris ibn Umar ibn Idris
- Religion: Islam

Yahya IV or Yahya ibn Idris ibn Umar (Arabic: يحيى بن إدريس بن عمر) was an Idrisid ruler, ruling in Fes from 905 to 922. For the last three years of his reign, he acknowledged the overlordship of the Fatimid Caliphate, until he was deposed by the Fatimid general Masala ibn Habus. He died in exile at the Fatimid capital of al-Mahdiya in 946.

== Life ==
Yahya IV was the great-grandson of the second Idrisid emir, Idris II, (r. 808–828) by a junior line of the Idrisid dynasty. His uncle Ali ibn Umar had already briefly ruled from the Idrisid capital of Fes in the late 860s, before being driven off by a Kharijite rebellion. Yahya IV made Meknes, to the southwest of Fes, his base.

In traditional accounts, Ali is held to have been succeeded by his cousin Yahya III ibn al-Qasim, who in turn was killed in battle in 905 against Yahya IV's forces. In reality, Yahya III likely did not long rule in Fes and southern Morocco, where members of a third branch of the dynasty, the descendants of Isa ibn Idris II, held sway until c. 893. Yahya IV's family apparently supplanted them, and from 905, according to much later sources, Yahya IV ruled in Fes. The northern parts of Morocco remained under the rule of Yahya III's descendants.

It was during Yahya IV's reign that the Fatimid Caliphate appeared in Morocco, soon after its establishment in 909. The Berber Fatimid general Masala ibn Habus invaded Morocco, defeated Yahya IV in 919 (or 917), and forced the latter to accept Fatimid suzerainty. Three years later (922 or 919/20, accordingly), Masala returned and deposed Yahya IV outright, taking him prisoner and installing a Berber governor under the overall rule of Masala's cousin, Musa ibn Abi'l-Afiya. Musa had Yahya tortured to make him reveal the location of is treasures, before sending him to exile in Asilah. There he remained until 943, when he was sent to the Fatimid capital, al-Mahdiya. Yahya died there three years later.

Fes remained in Fatimid hands until 922 or 928 (the medieval sources differ), when al-Hasan al-Hajjam, a nephew of Yahya III , led a revolt and briefly drove the Fatimids out.

== Sources ==
- Benchekroun, Chafik T. (2016). "Les Idrissides entre Fatimides et Omeyyades". Revue des mondes musulmans et de la Méditerranée (in French). 139: 29–50. doi:10.4000/remmm.9412.
- Benchekroun, Chafik T. (2018). "Idrīsids". In Fleet, Kate; Krämer, Gudrun; Matringe, Denis; Nawas, John; Rowson, Everett (eds.). Encyclopaedia of Islam (3rd ed.). Brill Online. ISSN 1873-9830.
- Eustache, D. (1971). "Idrīsids". In Lewis, B.; Ménage, V. L.; Pellat, Ch. & Schacht, J. (eds.). The Encyclopaedia of Islam, Second Edition. Volume III: H–Iram. Leiden: E. J. Brill. pp. 1035–1037. OCLC 495469525.

| Preceded by Yahya III | Idrisid emir 905–922 (from 919 under Fatimid suzerainty) | Vacant Fatimid rule Title next held by al-Hasan I |
