= Yahya ibn al-Qasim =

Idirisid Emir (died 905)

Yahya III يحيى الثالث بن القاسم

Emir
- Reign: unknown–905
- Predecessor: Ali II ibn Umar
- Successor: Yahya IV ibn Idris
- Born: unknown
- Died: 905
Names
- Yahya ibn al-Qasim
- Dynasty: Idrisid
- Father: al-Qasim ibn Idris
- Religion: Islam

Yahya III ibn al-Qasim (Arabic: يحيى الثالث بن القاسم) was an Idrisid ruler.

== Life ==
Yahya was the son of al-Qasim, a younger son of the second Idrisid ruler, Idris II (r. 808–828). The family of al-Qasim controlled northern Morocco, with the cities of Tangier, Basra and Ceuta, and for a time in the 860s even the western half of the Idrisid capital, Fes.

Known by the sobriquet al-Miqdam, Yahya was called upon for assistance by the inhabitants of the Qaraqiyyin quarter of Fes when the town was occupied by the Kharijite rebel Abd al-Razzaq. Yahya drove the rebels away, and is traditionally accounted as the eighth Idrisid emir, until his death in 905.

Modern historians on the other hand consider that his rule over Fes is unlikely to have lasted long: his uncle, Dawud, appears to have ruled the city in 877, while numismatic evidence shows that between 880 and 893 the capital was ruled by members of a different branch of the Idrisid dynasty, descending from another uncle, Isa.

Yahya fell in battle in 905 against the forces of a cousin from a different branch of the dynasty, Yahya IV.

== Sources ==
- Benchekroun, Chafik T. (2018). "Idrīsids". In Fleet, Kate; Krämer, Gudrun; Matringe, Denis; Nawas, John; Rowson, Everett (eds.). Encyclopaedia of Islam (3rd ed.). Brill Online. doi:10.1163/1573-3912_ei3_COM_32374. ISSN 1873-9830.
- Eustache, D. (1971). "Idrīsids". In Lewis, B.; Ménage, V. L.; Pellat, Ch. & Schacht, J. (eds.). The Encyclopaedia of Islam, Second Edition. Volume III: H–Iram. Leiden: E. J. Brill. pp. 1035–1037. doi:10.1163/1573-3912_islam_SIM_3495. OCLC 495469525.

Preceded by Dawud or Ali II	Idrisid emir unknown–905	Succeeded by Yahya IV
