= Kenza =

Kenza may refer to:

== People ==
- Kenza al-Awrabiya, mother of Idris II of Morocco and spouse of Idris I.
- Kenza Fortas (born 2001), French actress
- Kenza Morsli (born 1990), Algerian singer.
- Kenza Zouiten (born 1991), Swedish fashion model.
- Kenza, South African DJ and music producer.

== Other uses ==
- Kenza (album), a 1999 studio album by Khaled.
