= Zenata =

Medieval Berber tribal confederation

Zenata Iznaten, Zenata, Zanata
- Berber tribal confederation
- Ethnicity: Berbers
- Location: Maghreb
- Branches: Maghrawa, Banu Ifran, Banu Wasin, Djarawa
- Language: Berber languages
- Religion: Islam

The Zenata (Berber languages: ⵉⵣⵏⴰⵜⵏ, romanized: Iznaten; Arabic: زناتة, romanized: Zanāta) were a group of Berber tribes, historically one of the largest Berber confederations along with the Sanhaja and Masmuda. Their lifestyle was either nomadic or semi-nomadic.

== Society ==
The 14th-century historiographer Ibn Khaldun reports that the Zenata were divided into three large tribes: Jarawa, Maghrawa, and Banu Ifran. Formerly occupying a large portion of the Maghreb, they were displaced to the south and west in conflicts with the more powerful Kutama and Houara.

The Zenata adopted Islam early, in the 7th century. While other Berber tribes continued to resist the Umayyad Caliphate conquest well into the 8th century, they were quickly Islamized. They also formed a substantial contingent in the subsequent Muslim conquest of Iberia.

== Language ==
As Berbers, the Zenata spoke a Berber language. Ibn Khaldun wrote that their dialect was distinct from other Berber dialects. French linguist Edmond Destaing in 1915 proposed "Zenati" as a loose subgrouping within the Northern Berber languages, including Riffian Berber in northeastern Morocco and Shawiya Berber in northeastern Algeria.

== Etymology ==
The etymology of the ethnonym Zenata is debated. Onomastically, the name is best explained as a Berber ethnonym derived from an eponymous personal or ancestral name, reconstructed in forms such as Jāna or Açāna, from which forms such as Ijanaten, Ǧanāta and Arabic Zanāta developed. On this interpretation, the form Zanāta is not the original source of the name, but an Arabic rendering of a Berber ethnonym. Medieval authors already connected the name with an ancestral figure. Ibn Ḥammād associated Banī Ǧāna, Açāna, Zanāt and Zanāta, while Ibn Khaldun used both Ǧanāta and Zanāta, preserving a variation that has been interpreted as evidence of the adaptation of a Berber name into Arabic orthography.

Ahmed M'Charek has suggested a possible continuity between Zanāta and ancient North African ethnonyms or toponyms such as Zanenses or Dianenses. Yves Modéran has cautioned against projecting the medieval ethnonym Zanāta directly into late antiquity, since it is not securely attested in the surviving Greek and Latin sources before the early Islamic period.

== Origins ==
The history of the Zenata before the Muslim conquests remains largely unknown, as they are primarily documented through Arabic sources. The term Zenata itself is relatively late and has no known roots in antiquity before the conquests. As historian Yves Modéran has argued, this makes it an unreliable basis for theories of migration in earlier periods. Their presence may therefore have resulted from movements that occurred after the conquest. The mentions of specific Zenata factions in medieval sources is uncertain when it comes to their history or the possibility that their affiliation was just in name rather than in origin. Hsain Ilahiane states that by the time of the Muslim conquests, the Zenata ranged between Tripolitania in present-day Libya and present-day southern Tunisia. According to Wadi ajal inscriptions, the Zenata descend from the Garamantes. Some Authors connect them to the Gaetuli. According to Modéran, the earliest known Zenata groups formed a tribe or confederation that established itself in Tripolitania by the late 7th century and was quickly integrated into the Arab military forces. In later periods, groups identified as Zenata moved steadily west, where they settled in western Algeria near Tiaret and Tlemcen, while some of them moved still further west to Morocco. According to Ibn Khaldun, they were native to the region between Zab and Tafilalt.

== Political history ==
The Zenata dominated the politics of the western Maghreb (Morocco and western Algeria) in two different periods: in the 10th century, during the decline of the Idrisids, as proxies for either the Fatimid Caliphs or the Umayyad Caliphs of Cordoba, and in the 13th to 16th centuries with the rise of the Zayyanid dynasty in Algeria and the Marinids and Wattasids in Morocco, all from Zenata tribes. Today, most of the Berbers of the Rif region are believed to be of Zenata ancestry.

=== 8th–11th centuries ===
In the early Islamic period of Morocco, Berber groups and tribes dominated the politics of the region well after the Arab conquests. The Zenata confederation did too. A Zenata chieftain, Khalid ibn Hamid al-Zanati, was a leading figure in the Berber revolt of 740 against the Arab Umayyad Caliphate, and led Berber rebels to major victories in the Battle of the Nobles and the Battle of Bagdoura. While the Umayyads managed to defeat the rebels eventually and reassert some of their authority, the westernmost parts of the Maghreb, including what is now Morocco, remained outside of Arab caliphal rule. In this vacuum, various principalities arose in the region, such as the Midrarid Emirate in eastern Morocco, led by a Zenata Miknasa tribe, to which the foundation of the city of Sijilmasa is attributed.

In 868, under the leadership of the Abd al-Razzaq, the Berber Khariji Sufri tribes of Madyuna, Ghayata and Miknasa formed a common front against the Idrisids of Fez. From their base in Sefrou they were able to defeat Ali ibn Umar and occupy Fez. The city's inhabitants refused to submit, however, and the Idrisid Yahya III was able to retake the city. Starting in the early 10th century, however, the Fatimids in the east began to intervene in present-day Morocco, hoping to expand their influence, and used the Miknasa as proxies and allies in the region. In 917 the Miknasa and its leader Masala ibn Habus, acting on behalf of their Fatimid allies, attacked Fez and forced Yahya IV to recognize Fatimid suzerainty, before deposing him in 919 or 921. He was succeeded by his cousin Musa ibn Abul 'Afiya, who had already been given charge over the rest of the country. The Idrisid Hassan I al-Hajam managed to wrest control of Fez from 925 but in 927 Musa returned, captured Hassan and killed him, marking the last time the Idrisids held power in Fez. Thereafter Fez remained under Zenata control. The Miknasa pursued the Idrisids to the fortress of Hajar an-Nasr in northern Morocco, but soon afterwards civil war broke out among the Miknasa when Musa switched allegiance to the Umayyads of Cordoba in 931 in an attempt to gain more independence. The Fatimids sent Humayd ibn Yasal (or Hamid), the nephew of Masala ibn Habus, to confront Musa, defeating him in 933 and forcing him to fall back into line. Once the Fatimids were gone, however, Musa once again threw off their authority and recognized the Umayyad caliph. The Fatimids sent their general Maysur to confront him again, and this time he fled. He was pursued and killed by the Idrisids. The latter preserved a part of their realm in northern Morocco until the Umayyads finally ended their rule definitively in 985. The Umayyads in turn kept control over northern Morocco until their caliphate's collapse in the early 11th century. Following this, Morocco was dominated by various Zenata Berber tribes. Until the rise of the Sanhaja Almoravids later in the century, the Maghrawa controlled Fez, Sijilmasa and Aghmat while the Banu Ifran ruled over Tlemcen, Salé (Chellah), and the Tadla region.

=== 13th–16th centuries ===
In the 13th century the Banu Marin (Arabic: بنو مرين), a Zenata tribe, rose to power in Morocco. Starting in 1245 they began overthrowing the Almohads who had controlled the region. At the height of their power in the mid-14th century, during the reigns of Abu al-Hasan and his son Abu Inan, the Marinid dynasty briefly held sway over most of the Maghreb including large parts of modern-day Algeria and Tunisia. They supported the Emirate of Granada in al-Andalus in the 13th and 14th centuries; an attempt to gain a direct foothold on the European side of the Strait of Gibraltar was however defeated at the Battle of Río Salado in 1340 and finished after the Castilians took Algeciras from the Marinids in 1344, definitively expelling them from the Iberian Peninsula. In contrast to their predecessors, the Marinids sponsored Maliki Sunnism as the official religion and made Fez their capital. Under their rule, Fez enjoyed a relative golden age. The Marinids also pioneered the construction of madrasas across the country which promoted the education of Maliki ulama, although Sufi sheikhs increasingly predominated in the countryside.

Starting in the early 15th century the Wattasid dynasty, a related ruling house, competed with the Marinid dynasty for control of their state and became de facto rulers of Morocco between 1420 and 1459 while officially acting as regents or viziers. In 1465 the last Marinid sultan, Abd al-Haqq II, was overthrown and killed by a revolt in Fez, which led to the establishment of direct Wattasid rule over most of Morocco. The Wattasids themselves were overthrown in the mid-16th century by the Arab Sharifian Saadians. The Saadians were later replaced by the current Alaouite dynasty.

Meanwhile, around the same time as the Marinids, the Zenata Zayyanid dynasty (also known as the Abd al-Wadids) ruled over the Kingdom of Tlemcen in northwestern Algeria, centered on Tlemcen. The territory stretched from Tlemcen to the Chelif bend and Algiers. At its zenith, the kingdom reached the Moulouya river to the west, Sijilmasa to the south, and the Soummam river to the east. The Zayyanid dynasty's rule lasted from 1235 until 1556, when their rule, under pressure from the Spanish in Oran and the Saadians in Morocco, was finally ended by the Ottomans.

Zanata tribesmen also played a role as light cavalry in the armies of the Emirate of Granada. This gave rise to the Spanish term jinete (derived from the name 'Zenata'), which denoted this type of light cavalry. They formed the backbone of the Granadan army, serving both in crucial battles as well as in regular raids inside Christian territory. They were highly mobile on the field, armed with lances, javelins, and small round shields known for their flexibility, and used their own characteristic set of tactics. They were recruited and led by exiled members of the Marinid family and settled within the kingdom of Granada. Their Marinid commander was known as the shaykh al-ghuzāt ('chief of the ghazis'), but in 1374 Muhammad V suppressed this office due to their political interference, after which they were commanded by a Nasrid or Andalusi general. They also served as mercenaries in the armies of Christian kingdoms such as Castile or as auxiliaries sent by the Nasrid emirs of Granada to aid their Castilian allies.

=== Present day ===
Several contemporary Berber groups have linguistic or cultural ties to the medieval Zenata. These include the Riffians, Beni Snassen, Chaouis, and Maghrawa.

== See also ==
- Numidia
- Dihya
- Zanata Stone
- Su'da
