= Al-Hasan ibn al-Qasim Jannun =

Idrisid ruler from 954 to 974

Al-Hasan II الحسن الثاني

Emir
- Reign: 954–974
- Predecessor: Abu'l-Aysh ibn al-Qasim Jannun
- Born: Unknown
- Died: 985
Names
- Al-Hasan II ibn Al-Qassim Gannoun
- Dynasty: Idrisid
- Father: Al-Qasim Jannun
- Religion: Islam

Al-Hasan ibn al-Qasim Jannun (Arabic: الحسن الثاني بن القاسم كنون) was the thirteenth and last Idrisid ruler. He took over after Abu l-Aish Ahmad in 954 until his capture by the Umayyads in 974. He was then exiled to Córdoba, Spain. In 985, he returned from Cairo to western Maghreb (in what is now Morocco) with Fatimid support and attempted to regain control. However, he was defeated that same year by an Umayyad general and was then executed.

== Sources ==
- Benchekroun, Chafik T. (2018). "Idrīsids". In Fleet, Kate; Krämer, Gudrun; Matringe, Denis; Nawas, John; Rowson, Everett (eds.). Encyclopaedia of Islam (3rd ed.). Brill Online. doi:10.1163/1573-3912_ei3_COM_32374. ISSN 1873-9830.
- Eustache, D. (1971). "Idrīsids". In Lewis, B.; Ménage, V. L.; Pellat, Ch. & Schacht, J. (eds.). The Encyclopaedia of Islam, Second Edition. Volume III: H–Iram. Leiden: E. J. Brill. pp. 1035–1037. doi:10.1163/1573-3912_islam_SIM_3495. OCLC 495469525.

Preceded by Abu l-Aish Ahmad	Idrisid dynasty 954–974	Succeeded by Maghrawas under the suzerainty of the Umayyads of Cordoba
