= Yahya ibn Yahya =

Idrisid Emir from 863 to 866

Yahya II يحيى الثاني

Emir
- Reign: 863–866
- Predecessor: Yahya I ibn Muhammad
- Successor: Ali II
- Born: unknown
- Died: 866
Names
- Yahya ibn Yahya ibn Muhammad ibn Idris ibn Idris
- Dynasty: Idrisid
- Father: Yahya I ibn Muhammad
- Religion: Islam

Yahya ibn Yahya (Arabic: يحيى بن يحيى) was the sixth Idrisid ruler and the last of the main branch of the dynasty.

== Life ==
Yahya was the namesake son of the fifth Idrisid emir, Yahya ibn Muhammad, and came to power in 863. Unlike the consolidating tendencies of his two predecessors, he was a weak ruler who preferred the luxuries of palace life to government. He parcelled out the Idrisid realm to his relatives: his uncle Husayn received much land to the south of the capital, Fes; his great-uncle, al-Qasim, received the western half of Fes itself, along with the eastern frontier provinces of the Berber tribes of Luwata and Kutama; and another great-uncle, Dawud ibn Idris, who ruled the country of the Hawwara Berbers, also increased his domains.

Yahya's reign in Fes appears to have been secure, as coins with his name are known, unlike his father. Nevertheless, Yahya's dissolute life soon led to scandal, which forced him to flee the palace into the Andalusian quarter of Fes, where he died in unclear circumstances. A powerful citizen of Fes, Abd al-Rahman ibn Abi Sahl al-Judhami, tried to seize power, but Yahya's widow called upon her father, Ali ibn Umar from the collateral Banu Umar branch of the Idrisids, for aid. Ali gained control over Fes, but his power was challenged by Kharijite rebels, and power eventually passed to the Banu Qasim branch of the family.

== Sources ==
- Benchekroun, Chafik T. (2018). "Idrīsids". In Fleet, Kate; Krämer, Gudrun; Matringe, Denis; Nawas, John; Rowson, Everett (eds.). Encyclopaedia of Islam (3rd ed.). Brill Online. doi:10.1163/1573-3912_ei3_COM_32374. ISSN 1873-9830.
- Eustache, D. (1971). "Idrīsids". In Lewis, B.; Ménage, V. L.; Pellat, Ch. & Schacht, J. (eds.). The Encyclopaedia of Islam, Second Edition. Volume III: H–Iram. Leiden: E. J. Brill. pp. 1035–1037. doi:10.1163/1573-3912_islam_SIM_3495. OCLC 495469525.

Preceded by Yahya I	Idrisid emir 863–866	Succeeded by Ali II
