= Yahya ibn Muhammad =

Idrisid Emir from 849 to 863

Yahya I يحيى الأول

Emir
- Reign: 849–863
- Predecessor: Ali ibn Muhammad
- Successor: Yahya II ibn Yahya
- Born: 829
- Died: 863
- Issue: Yahya ibn Yahya
- Dynasty: Idrisid
- Father: Muhammad ibn Idris
- Religion: Islam

Yahya ibn Muhammad (Arabic: يحيى بن محمد; died 863) was the fifth Idrisid ruler

== Life ==
Yahya was a younger son of the fourth Idrisid emir, Muhammad ibn Idris, and took over the rule in Morocco after the death of his brother Ali I in January 849.

Following the stabilization and consolidation of Idrisid authority by his brother, Yahya's reign is commonly regarded, in the words of historian Chafik T. Benchekroun, as "the very picture of prosperous and tranquil rule". During this time, the Idrisid capital at Fes expanded greatly with the arrival of people from al-Andalus and Ifriqiya. Thus the establishment of the two great mosques of Fes, the al-Qarawiyyin ('Mosque of the Kairouanis') and the Andalusian Mosque, is traditionally ascribed to his reign, in 859. At least for the Qarawiyyin, this claim is clearly a legend, as an inscription has been found proclaiming its foundation in 877.

Despite the traditional view of the reign as peaceful, modern historians have remarked on the complete absence of coins minted in his name at Fes, whereas there exist coins in the name of a certain Abu Sahl, possibly related to Abd al-Rahman ibn Abi Sahl al-Judhami, whose family is known to have fought the Idrisids for control of Fes a few years after Yahya's death.

Yahya died in 863 and was succeeded by his son, Yahya II.

== Sources ==
- Benchekroun, Chafik T. (2018). "Idrīsids". In Fleet, Kate; Krämer, Gudrun; Matringe, Denis; Nawas, John; Rowson, Everett (eds.). Encyclopaedia of Islam (3rd ed.). Brill Online. doi:10.1163/1573-3912_ei3_COM_32374. ISSN 1873-9830.
- Eustache, D. (1971). "Idrīsids". In Lewis, B.; Ménage, V. L.; Pellat, Ch. & Schacht, J. (eds.). The Encyclopaedia of Islam, Second Edition. Volume III: H–Iram. Leiden: E. J. Brill. pp. 1035–1037. doi:10.1163/1573-3912_islam_SIM_3495. OCLC 495469525.

Preceded by Ali I	Idrisid emir 849–863	Succeeded by Yahya II
