= Hajar al-Nasr =

Ancient fortress in northern Morocco

Coordinates: 35.2351°N 5.6782°W

Hadjar al-Nasr (Arabic: حجر النسر, lit. 'the vulture's rock') is an ancient fortress located in northern Morocco. It was constructed in the 10th century by the Idrisid dynasty. The archaeological site is situated on a rocky crest overlooking the headwaters of a tributary of the Loukkos River around 40 km almost due east of the modern city of Larache.

The fortress was probably built by Muhammad ibn Idris or one of his sons during the 9th century, and was finally destroyed in 996 by the Maghrawa chief Ziri ibn Atiyya. It served as a haven for the Idrisid dynasty's rulers, and sometimes alternated with al-Basra as their capital.

The location of Hadjar an-Nasar was a mystery to historians for the last two hundred years. In 1905 a French researcher noted that Sīdī Mazwār, who as eldest son of the Idrisid ruler Ali ibn Idris had renounced power and dedicated his life to religion, was buried there. Because the marabout of Sīdī Mazwār is a known shrine and pilgrimage site of the Larache region to this day, this should have fixed the location. However, this clue was ignored, and as late as 1980 an American expedition searched in vain for the site some 30 km away. A combined Spanish and Moroccan expedition visited the correct location in 1993 and have provided the only description published so far (Cressier et al., see below). Some sections of the ramparts and some steps, all built in massive stone blocks, are the only ruins visible on the surface.

== Sources ==
- Deverdun, G. (1971). "Ḥad̲j̲ar al- Nasr". In Lewis, B.; Ménage, V. L.; Pellat, Ch. & Schacht, J. (eds.). The Encyclopaedia of Islam, Second Edition. Volume III: H–Iram. Leiden: E. J. Brill. pp. 30–31. doi:10.1163/1573-3912_islam_SIM_2596. OCLC 495469525.
- (in French) P. Cressier, A el Boujay, H el Figuigi & J Vignet-Zunz, « Hagar al-Nasr, "capitale" idrisside du Maroc Septentrional: archéologie et histoire ». In Genèse de la ville islamique en al-Andalus et au Maghreb Occidental, Casa de Velasquez, Madrid (1995), p. 303-334. (ISBN 84-00-07766-0)
- (in French) C. El Briga, « Hadjar en-Nesr ». In Encyclopédie berbère, vol.21, Aix-en-Provence, Edisud (1999), p. 3299-3300
