= Abu'l-Aysh ibn al-Qasim Jannun =

Idrisid Emir from 948 to 954

Ahmad I أحمد الأول

Emir
- Reign: 948–954
- Predecessor: Al-Qassim Guennoun
- Successor: Al-Hassan ibn Guennoun
- Died: 954
Names
- Abul-Aish Ahmad ibn Al-Qassim Guennoun
- Dynasty: Idrisid
- Father: Al-Qassim Guennoun
- Religion: Islam

Abu'l-Aysh ibn al-Qasim Jannun (Arabic: أبو العيش أحمد بن القاسم كنون) was the twelfth Idrisid ruler. He took over after Al Qasim Gannum in AD 948 until his death in AD 954.

== Sources ==
- Benchekroun, Chafik T. (2018). "Idrīsids". In Fleet, Kate; Krämer, Gudrun; Matringe, Denis; Nawas, John; Rowson, Everett (eds.). Encyclopaedia of Islam (3rd ed.). Brill Online. doi:10.1163/1573-3912_ei3_COM_32374. ISSN 1873-9830.
- Eustache, D. (1971). "Idrīsids". In Lewis, B.; Ménage, V. L.; Pellat, Ch. & Schacht, J. (eds.). The Encyclopaedia of Islam, Second Edition. Volume III: H–Iram. Leiden: E. J. Brill. pp. 1035–1037. doi:10.1163/1573-3912_islam_SIM_3495. OCLC 495469525.

Preceded by Al Qasim Gannum	Idrisid dynasty 948–954	Succeeded by Al-Hasan ben Kannun
