= Sulaymanid dynasty =

Arab Muslim dynasty of Algeria

Sulaymanid dynasty السليمانيون
- 814–922
- Capital: Tlemcen; Ténès
- Common languages: Arabic, Berber languages
- Religion: Islam
- Government: Monarchy
- Historical era: Medieval
  - Established: 814
  - Disestablished: 922
Preceded by	Succeeded by
Berber Revolt	Caliphate of Córdoba; Almoravid dynasty

The Sulaymanid dynasty (Arabic: السليمانيون, romanized: as-Sulaymāniyyūn) was an Arab Muslim dynasty in present-day western Algeria, ruling from 814 to 922. The dynasty is named after the founder, Sulyaman I, who was the brother of Idris I, the founder of the Idrisid dynasty based in Fez (present-day Morocco). Both Sulayman and Idris, as great-grandchildren of Hasan ibn Ali, were sharifs descended from Muhammad.

== History ==
=== Sulayman and his son Muhammad ===
The history of the Sulaymānid dynasty is poorly understood and historians have few chronological benchmarks. It begins according to Ibn Khaldūn with the flight of Sulaymān Ibn ʿAbd Allāh al-Kāmil towards the Maghreb after the Battle of Fakhkh in 786, then its takeover of Tlemcen then in the hand of the Zenata, (in the northwest of present-day Algeria). But not all Arab chroniclers agree that this brother of Idrīs I survived the massacre or that he does not owe him the governorate of the city.

According to Ibn Khaldun, Sulayman I reached Tlemcen after the assassination of his brother Idris I in 791 and took control of it. But according to Ibn Idhari and Al-Bakri, he settled in Tlemcen while his brother was alive and probably with his approval.

It seems better supported that Idrīs II, the son of Idrīs I, conquered around 814 Tlemcen, a city then probably with a strong Christian population, a meeting point of the Berber populations and a meeting place of the markets, by putting on the run its Maghrawa ruler, Muḥammad Ibn H̱azar. He would then have handed the city over to his cousin Muḥammad, the son of Sulaymān, who thereby founded the Sulaymānid dynasty. (Note: Historian Daniel Eustache raised the possibility that Sulaymān and his son Muḥammad were already in Tlemcen and recognized by the Maghrāwa Berbers when Idris II reached the city in 814. This account, described by historical chroniclers Ibn Idhari and Al-Bakri, is repeated by historians Philippe Sénac et Patrice Cressier, who state that Sulaymān was governor of Tlemcen between 786 and 813.) In 828, Muḥammad Ibn Idrīs II erected the government of Muḥammad Ibn Sulaymān as a viceroyalty.

According to historian Gilbert Meynier, Mūḥāmmād Ibn Sūlāymān created in the region of Tlemcen the "Sulaymanid kingdom", a state which seemed to control only the cities, coexisting with the neighboring tribes which preserved their Kharidjite heterodoxy. Tlemcen (then called Agadir) became a distinguished city, in growing connection with the Arab culture of Al-Andalus. In 931, the Fatimids took the city and put an end to the power of the Sulaymanids, who took refuge in Al-Andalus.

According to Ibn Khaldūn in his appendix IV, Sūlāymān I (Sīd Sūlāymān Ibn ‘Abd Allah al-Kāmīl) escaped towards the Maghreb during the early Abbasid period, arriving at Tiaret after the death of his brother Idris I, and wanted to take power. However, the Berbers resisted threats from Sūlāymān and the Banu Tamim of the Arab Aghlabid dynasty ordered his arrest. Sūlāymān went to Tlemcen and became master of all the Zeneta tribes of this locality. His son Mūhāmmād Ibn Sūlāymān succeeded him and his children shared all of the central Maghreb after the death of Sūlāymān.

=== Later successors ===
The sons of Mūhāmmād Ibn Sūlaymān shared all of the central Maghreb (present-day Algeria) after the death of their father. The government of Tlemcen was under the responsibility of Aḥmād, son of Mūḥāmmād, then of Mūḥāmmād, son of Aḥmād, and then of his son Al-Qassim. ‘Ayssā, son of Mūhāmmād, obtained the town of Arshgul (town and island at Tafna, a river eight leagues from Tlemcen) and joined forces with the Fatimids. ‘Aysā's brother Idris became ruler of the territories of the Dejrawa. His son Abû'l ‘Aysh Ibn Aysā succeeded him. After the death of Abu'l ‘Aysh Ayssā, Al Hasen b. Abu'l ‘Aysh took power among the Dejrawas. After that, it was Ibrahim's turn and then that of his sons: Yahya, Ibrahim and Idris. Idris received Arshgul, on the other hand, his brother Yahya joined forces with the Umayyads of Cordoba in the time of Abd al-Rahman III. This provoked the Fatimids in 935. Yahya was arrested by general Mansur.

The city of the Dejrawas sheltered Al-Hāsān Ibn Abû'l ‘Aysh and was besieged and taken by Ibn Abû'l‘ Afya, representative of the Umayyads in the central Maghreb. Al-Hāsān then escaped to join his cousin Idris, son of Ibrahim, chief of Arshgul. Al-Buri, son of Mūsā Ibn Abû'l ‘Afya later took the city.

Ténès (in present-day Chlef Province in Algeria) was the seat of Ibrahim, son of Mūḥāmmād, then came into the hands of his son Mūḥāmmād, of the same name, then to Ibrahim (again of the same name), then to Yahya and Ali. The latter was defeated by the Zirids during the reign of Ziri ibn Manad in 953. Ali then took refuge with the Maghrawas. Al Kheyr Ibn Mūhāmmād Ibn Khazer of the Maghrawa helped Hamza and Yahya, son of Ali, to cross to the Iberian Peninsula.

Ahmed, son of Sulayman, son of Ibrahim, was a ruler of the central Maghreb. Among the descendants of Mūhāmmād, son of Sulayman, was Ituwish, son of Hatesh, son of Al Hassan, son of Muhammed, son of Sulayman, and Hammad, son of Ali, son of Mūhāmmād, son of Sulayman.

Ibn Khaldun noted that, according to Ibn Hazm, Suk Hamza at Bougie did not bear the name of an Idrisid but of a Sulaymanid. He adds that Jawhar al-Siqilli, the Fatimid general, took Hamza's sons to Kairouan in present-day Tunisia.

== Religion ==
The family of Idris, which included Sulayman I, have been described as a Zaydi Shia Muslim dynasty, while other academics have described the Idrisids as Sunni Muslims. Cornell asserts that the Idrisids brought with them to the western Maghreb from the Arabian Peninsula a form of archaic Shi'ism that was very similar to Zaydism. They were opponents of the Abbasid Caliphate.

== Sulaymanid currency ==
Coins of the Sulaymanids minted at Souk Ibrahim and Ténès have been found. Until recently the coins of Mūḥāmmād Ibn Sūlāymān, the founder of the line and his great grandson Aḥmād Ibn ‘Isā were known only. The signatures struck « Mādīnāt Ībrāhīm Ibn Mūḥāmmād », « Mādīnāt ‘Isā Ibn Ibrāhīm and Mādīnāt al-Qāssīm Ibn ‘Isā » are all honorary titles of Suq Ibrahim, while Burjayn, a typing of Yahya Ibn Muhammad, could well be the pseudonym of Ténès.

== The dynasty ==
=== Rulers ===
- Sulayman ibn Abd-Allah, known as "Sulayman I of Tlemcen" – Emir of Tlemcen (786 / 7–813)
- Muhammad Ibn Sulayman, known as "Muhammad I" – Emir of Tlemcen (813–828)
- Isa ibn Muhammad, known as "Isa I" – Emir of Arshkul (since 828)
- Ahmad ibn Muhammad, known as "Ahmad I" – Emir of Tlemcen (since 828)
- Muhammad ibn Ahmad, known as "Muhammad II" – Emir of Tlemcen
- al-Qasim ibn Muhammad, known as "Al-Qassim I" – Emir of Tlemcen (until 931)
- Idris ibn Muhammad, known as "Idris I of Algeria" – Emir of Jarava (since 828)
- Abu'l-Ish Aisa, known as "‘Issa II" – Emir of Jarava
- Al-Hassan ibn Abi'l-Aish, known as "Al-Hassan I of Algeria" – Emir of Jarava (around 935)
- Ibrahim ibn Idris, known as "Ibrahim I" – Emir of Arshkul
- Yahya ibn Ibrahim, known as "Yahya I" – arrested by the Fatimid warlord Mizur in 935
- Ibrahim ibn Ibrahim
- Idris ibn Ibrahim, known as "Idris II of Algeria" – Emir of Arshkul (around 935)
- Ibrahim ibn Muhammad, known as "Ibrahim II" – Emir of Tenes and Suk-Ibrahim (since 828)
- Isa ibn Ibrahim, known as "‘Issa III" – Emir of Suk Ibrahim (which is located in the chelif river)
- al-Qasim ibn Isa, known as "Al-Qassim II" – Emir of Suk Ibrahim
- Ahmad ibn Isa, known as "Ahmad II" – Emir of Suk Ibrahim
- Muhammad ibn Ibrahim, known as "Muhammad III" – Emir of Tenes
- Yahya ibn Muhammad, known as "Yahya II" – Emir of Tenes

== Family tree ==
Family tree of the Sulaymanid dynasty

Abd al-Muttalib ibn Hashim
Abu Talib ibn Abd al-Muttalib	Abd Allah ibn Abd al-Muttalib
Muhammad ibn Abd Allah
Ali ibn Abi Talib	Fatima bint Muhammad
Hasan ibn Ali
Hasan ibn Hasan al-Muthanna
Abd Allah ibn Hasan al-Kamil
Sulyaman I ibn Abdullah; Emir of Tlemcen
Muhammad I ibn Sulayman; Emir of Tlemcen
Isa I ibn Muhammad; Emir of Arshkul	Ahmad I ibn Muhammad; Emir of Tlemcen	Idris I ibn Muhammad; Emir of Jarava	Ibrahim II ibn Muhammad; Emir of Tenes and Suk-Ibrahim
Muhammad II ibn Ahmad; Emir of Tlemcen	Isa II ibn Idris; Emir of Jarava	Ibrahim I ibn Idris; Emir of Arshkul	Isa III ibn Ibrahim; Emir of Suk-Ibrahim	Muhammad III ibn Ibrahim; Emir of Tenes
Al-Qasim I ibn Muhammad; Emir of Tlemcen	Hasan ibn Isa; Emir of Jarava	Yahya I ibn Ibrahim	Ibrahim ibn Ibrahim	Idris II ibn Ibrahim; Emir of Arshkul	Al-Qasim II ibn Isa; Emir of Suk-Ibrahim	Ahmad II ibn Isa; Emir of Suk-Ibrahim	Yahya II ibn Muhammad; Emir of Tenes	Abd Allah ibn Muhammad; Emir of Tenes
Ali ibn Yahya; Emir of Tenes
Hamza ibn Ali	Yahya ibn Ali

== See also ==
- Hammudid dynasty
- Kingdom of Libya
  - Senussi
- History of Algeria
- History of Morocco
- List of Shi'a Muslim dynasties
