= Ghomara people =

Berber tribal group

غمارة ⵉⵖⵎⴰⵔⵏ
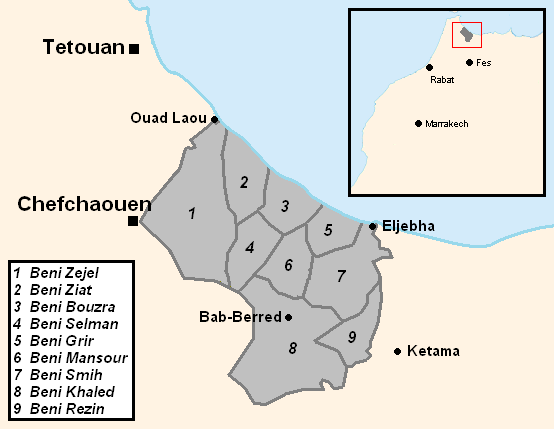
- Location map of the Ghomara tribes

Total population
- More than 250,000

Regions with significant populations
- Western Rif, Morocco

Languages
- Arabic, Ghomara Berber (for Beni Bouzra and Beni Mansour)

Religion
- Sunni Islam

Related ethnic groups
- other Berbers

The Ghomara (Arabic: غمارة, romanized: Ghumāra, Berber languages: ⵉⵖⵎⴰⵔⵏ Ighmaren) are a Berber tribal confederation that inhabit northern Morocco. They live in the western Rif, in the area of Chefchaouen and Tetouan.

While most have shifted to speaking Arabic, a minority continue to speak the Berber Ghomara language.

== Tribes ==
The Ghomara are traditionally divided into nine tribes:

- Beni Bouzra
- Beni Grir
- Beni Khaled
- Beni Mansour
- Beni Rezin
- Beni Selman
- Beni Smih
- Beni Zejel
- Beni Ziat

== Traditions ==
The Ghomara of the Rif believe that their country was populated in ancient times by “the Ahl Sous,” the people of Sous, and this opinion is shared by all the populations of northwestern Morocco. This tradition can be explained by toponymic considerations: it seems that there was a time when the whole of Atlantic Morocco, from Tangier to Agadir, was called Sous. Yaqut's geographical dictionary, dating from the 13th century, expressly mentions a Sous in the North, of which Tangier was the capital. Another 10th-century classic, Al-Muqadassi, also distinguishes between Sus al-Adna, the “near” Sous, with Fez as its capital and encompassing a “Balad Ghumar”.

It is therefore not surprising that the land of Ghomara was occupied by the “People of Sous” (Ahl Sus); these were not southern invaders but simply neighbors attracted by the resources and refuge offered by the region. These populations belonged to the Masmouda group, which at that time seemed to have spread throughout Atlantic Morocco.

Tradition has it that the “People of Sous” were driven from their homes by seven years of uninterrupted rain, or perhaps thick fog or some other calamity. Before leaving, they buried their riches on site, taking the precaution of noting the exact location on a parchment. Even today, Soussis still arrive in the country armed with clues that they believe will enable them to recover their ancestors' treasures.

== History ==
The current country of the Ghomara is very small compared to their original territory. They seem to have occupied vast lands on either side of their current domain; thus Yulian (Count Julien), who held Sabta (Ceuta) on behalf of the Visigoths, was, in the eyes of Ibn Khaldoun, a Masmoudian prince. Conversion to Islam did not come without difficulty. The development of Kharijism among the Berbers and the wars that followed, then the decline of the Idrisid dynasty, facilitated the infiltration of the Zenatas, who became masters of the peripheral cities: Sabta, Tangier, and Fez. Conflicts between Masmouda and Sanhaja facilitated the Almoravid conquest. In 1067, Yousouf ben Tachfin occupied the Ghomara region and, two years later, seized Fez; during the assault, 3,000 Zenatas were massacred.

Further east, as early as the 8th century, the land of Nekkour, which stretched to the Ghomara Sanhadjian domains, had been conquered, according to tradition, by Saïd ben Idris ben Saleh. Defeated, the Rif Berbers embraced Islam, which was preached to them by Saleh ibn Mansour, an Arab of Himyarite origin. Like so many other Maghrebis, the Ghomara and the Sanhadja soon renounced the new religion; they drove out Saleh and took as their leader an adventurer from Nefza, Dawoud er-Rondi. El-Bekri tells us that, shortly afterwards, they converted again, put Dawoud to death and recalled Saleh, whose nephew and successor, Saïd ibn Idris, founded Nekour. This city developed rapidly thanks to its relations with the Iberian Peninsula, but its renown attracted a raid by barbarians (Normans), who plundered it in 859. Saïd's long reign was further troubled by the revolt of a group of Berbers commanded by a certain Seggen.

At the beginning of the 10th century, the Ghomara country and neighboring regions experienced a religious upheaval that began in the tribe of Majkasa, near Tetouan, where a preacher nicknamed Ha-mim proclaimed himself a prophet and proposed to reform the Quran and Islamic practices. He reduced the duration of fasting during the month of Ramadan; but his followers had to fast every Thursday and Wednesday until noon; likewise, the daily prayers were reduced to two, one at sunrise and the other at sunset. He abolished the pilgrimage and allowed the consumption of pork, while eggs of all kinds of birds were prohibited. In the profession of faith and the prayers he proposed, his paternal aunt was mentioned, a fortune teller and magician known by various names: Tanguit, Tayfik, Tanant. The unrest that accompanied Ha-mim's preaching quickly turned into open struggle against the established powers. Ha-mim was defeated and put to death among the Masmouda neighbors of Tangier in 928.

== Bibliography ==
- G. Camps & J. Vignet-Zunz, "Ghomâra", Encyclopédie berbère, vol.20, 1998, pp. 3110–3119
- Jamal el Hannouche, "Arabic influence in Ghomara Berber", Leiden University, 2010.
- Jamal el Hannouche, "Ghomara Berber, a brief grammatical survey", Leiden University, 2008.
- Peter Behnstedt,"La frontera entre el bereber y el árabe en el Rif", Estudios de dialectología norteafricana y andalusí vol. 6, 2002.
- Georges Séraphin Colin, "Le parler berbère des Ghomara", Hesperis 9, 1929, pp. 43–58.
- AL-MUQADDASÎ, Description de l’Occident musulman au IVe-Xe siècle, trad. Ch. Pellat, Alger, 1950.
- EL-BEKRI, Description de l’Afrique septentrionale. Trad, de Slane, Paris, Adrien-Maison-neuve, 1965.
