= Sa'id I ibn Idris =

Sa'id I ibn Idris (760–803) (Arabic: سعيد بن ادريس الأول) was emir of Nekor. He moved the capital from Temsaman to Nekor. The city was later sacked by the Normans, who took many prisoners, a few of whom were ransomed by the Umayyad ruler of Spain. Later, part of the Ghomara tribe revolted, led by a person called Segguen; their revolt was defeated.

Sa'id I ibn Idris is the ancestor of the Berber Jebala people of Tangier, Tétouan and Chefchaouen.
