= Kenza al-Awrabiya =

كنزة الأوربية Kenza al-Awrabiya
- Spouse: Idris I
- Issue: Idris II
- House: Idrisid dynasty
- Father: Isaac ben Mohammed ben Hammid
- Religion: Islam

Kenza al-Awrabiya (en Arabic: كنزة الأوربية) surnamed Kenza al Mardhia was a Berber lady in the 8th century, as the daughter of Isaac ben Mohammed ben Hammid.

She married Idris I. And by this matrimonial alliance, she enabled him to exercise power over the territory of the Awraba, her tribe. She was the mother of his posthumous son Idris II.

Alongside the regent of the kingdom, Rachid, she exercised a leading political role during the minority of her son. Throughout her life, Kenza maintained her status of matriarch in accordance with Berber customs, as such, she arbitrated the smooth running of the division of the kingdom between her grandsons.
