= Nekor =

Historic site in Morocco

Coordinates: 35.0898°N 3.8075°W

Nekor (Arabic: نقور) is a historic site in the Rif region of Morocco near modern-day Bni Bouayach. It was founded by Idris ibn Salih, Emir of the medieval Kingdom of Nekor, between 749 and 761 AD. His son Sa'id I ibn Idris moved the capital to Nekor from Temsaman. At its height, it was described as the greatest center of Berber culture in the region of Rif.

In 859, a major long-distance Viking expedition, under the command of two famed Vikings, Björn Ironside and Hásteinn, set out for Spain from their base on the Loire with the objective of sacking the city of Rome. They tried to land at Galicia and were driven off. Then they sailed down the west coast of the peninsula and burned the mosque at Seville, but were repelled by a large Muslim force there before entering the Mediterranean through the Straits of Gibraltar and burning the mosque at Algeciras, following which they headed south to Nekor on the coast of Morocco, plundered the city and defeated a Muslim force that attempted to stop them.

The city was destroyed by the Almoravid Yusuf ibn Tashfin in 1080 during his conquest of the Rif.

The site has been partially submerged by the reservoir of the Abdelkrim Khattabi dam.
