= Salih I ibn Mansur =

Salih I ibn Mansur (Arabic: صالح ابن منصور الأول) was the founder of the Kingdom of Nekor, located in the Rif Mountains of Morocco. Sources describe him as being either of Himyarite Arab descent or of Nafza Berber descent. His dynasty was responsible for converting the local Berber tribes to Islam. Initially the local tribes resisted the restrictions of the new religion and soon deposed their ruler but he was later asked to return and assume power again. His dynasty, the Banu Salih, ruled the region until 1019.
