= Idrisid dirham =

Idrisid coin

الدرهم الإدريسي (Arabic)
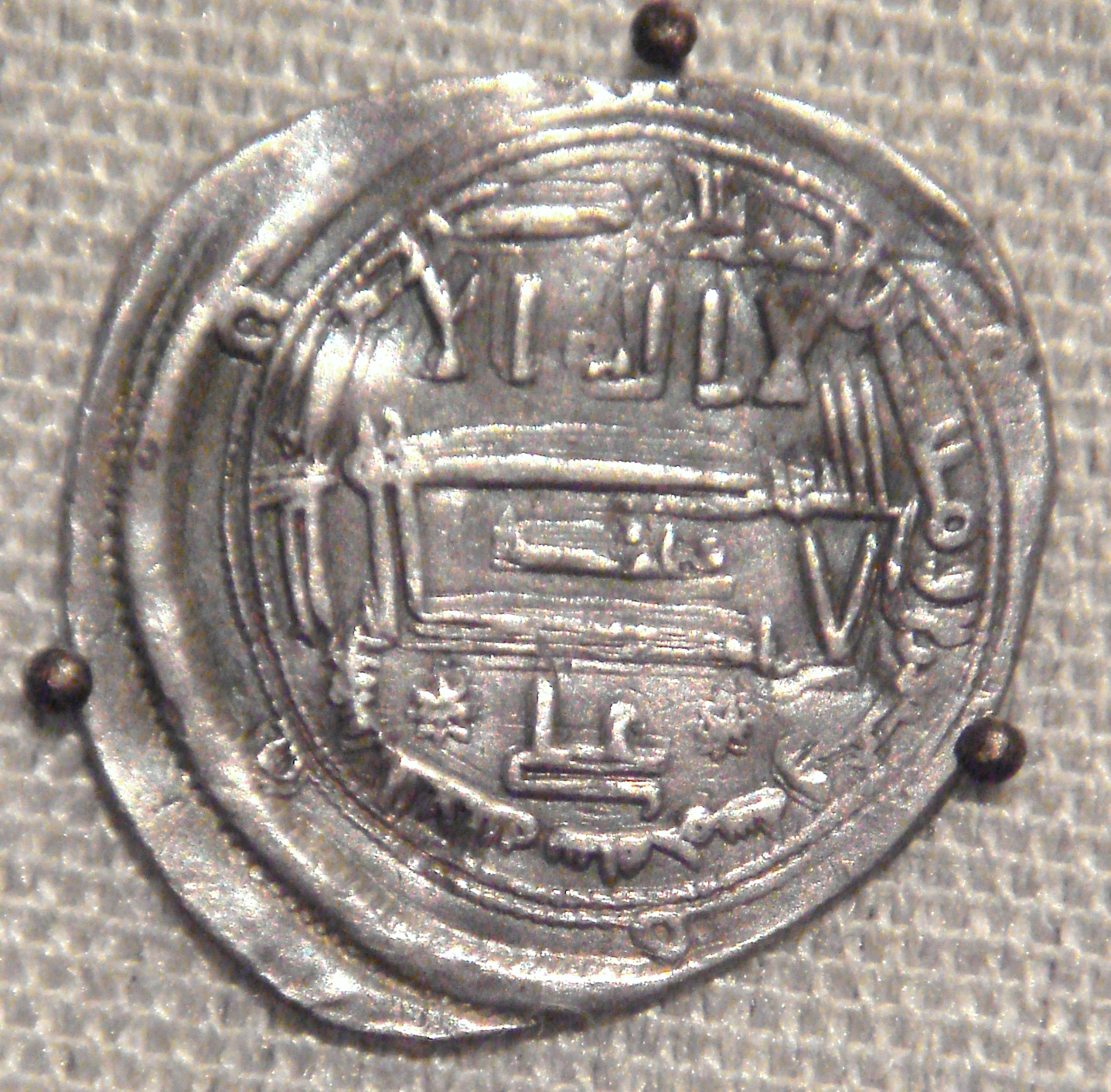

Demographics
- User(s): Idrisid dynasty
- This infobox shows the latest status before this currency was rendered obsolete.

The Idrisid dirham (Arabic: الدرهم الإدريسي) is a silver coin minted under the Idrisid dynasty.

== Name ==
The word "dirham" (درهم) comes from drachma (δραχμή), the Greek coin. "Dirham" is also the name of the currency in use in Morocco today. Idris I was the founder of the Idrisid dynasty.

== History ==
They were first struck under Idris I (788–791) in Tudgha and Volubilis. Ultimately, they were minted at approximately 20 different workshops.

== Description ==
Inscriptions on the coins indicate the dynasty's Zaidiyyah Shia alignment. They promoted the dynasty's lineage tracing back to Ali, which gave the dynasty legitimacy. The Iraqi Kufic script on these coins influenced the early development of Maghrebi script. The Kufic script on these coins is basic and unembellished, reflecting the economic status of the Idrisid state.

== Use ==
Idrisid dirhams circulated widely in the Middle East and have been found as far as Russia and the Balkans.
