= Basra, Morocco =

Basra ٱلْبَصْرَة
- Temporary capital of the Idrisid dynasty
- Historic location in Morocco
- Coordinates: 34°48′24″N 5°52′14″W
- Country: Morocco
- Region: Rabat-Salé-Kénitra
- Built by Idrisids: 833
- Founder: Muhammad ibn Idris
- Named for: Basra, Iraq

Basra (Arabic: ٱلْبَصْرَة), nicknamed Basra al-Hamra (Arabic: ٱلْبَصْرَة الحَمْراءُ, lit. 'Basra the Red'), was a settlement and historic town in northwestern Morocco. It was founded in 833 by the Idrisid dynasty, under the reign of the Emir Muhammad ibn Idris II. It was originally the summer capital of the Idrisid dynasty from the 8th to 10th centuries after they were driven out of Fes by the Fatimids. It is currently located in the Rabat-Salé-Kénitra region. It is situated on the road from Souk El Arbaa to Ouezzane, about 40 km from the Atlantic coast and 20 km south of Ksar el-Kebir.

It was named after the city of Basra in Iraq by the Idrisids in remembrance of it. It experienced considerable development and quickly emerged from a simple village to the summer residence of the Idrisid emirs. The geographer and traveller Ibn Hawqal in the 9th century described it as a flourishing commercial centre and mentioned that it is of medium size and is surrounded by defensive walls. He also said that it was served by two river ports as a thriving center of commerce and an important area of cotton and grain production. Its main products were cereals, wheat, barley and cotton which it exported to Ifriqiya.

At the beginning of the 9th century, along with Asilah, Basra appeared to be a monetary minting workshop which produced Idrisid dirhams, the currency of the Idrisid Emirate. In 979, the Fatimids led a military expedition to Ceuta, and on the way they destroyed the walls and fortifications of Basra. The red earth fortifications which gave it its nickname were destroyed in 979 but the city lingered on. When Leo Africanus (1488–1548) explored it, it was in ruins.

The excavations undertaken in this site since 1980 have allowed a better understanding of the spatial organization of the site, the discovery of a metallurgical workshop and lithic tools attesting to the archaeological importance of the city. The wall of the city of al-Basra, once pierced by ten gates, was largely destroyed. Its layout, of which only the foundations remain, marries the relief and extends over a length of 2.5 km circumscribing an area of 30 hectares. The wall, 2.20m thick, is built of rubble and reinforced by semi-circular towers. A cistern built of stone was also brought to light by the excavations. It is covered by a vault supported by transverse arches and is 4.25m wide and 6m long.

== Sources ==
- D. Eustache, "Al-Basra, capital idrisside et son port". Hespéris XLII, 1955, 217–238. An important study.
- Ahmed Siraj, L'Image de la Tingitane. L'historiographie arabe medievale et l'Antiquite nord-africaine. École Française de Rome, 1995. ISBN 2-7283-0317-7. pp 558–565 discusses various problems connected with the archaeology and historiography.
