= Ali ibn Muhammad =

Ali ibn Muhammad is an Arabic given name followed by a patronymic. It literally means 'Ali, son of Muhammad'.

- Ali ibn Muhammad bin Idris, fourth ruler of Idrisid dynasty
- Ali ibn Muhammad ibn al-Walid, 5th Tayyibi Isma'ili Da'i al-Mutlaq
- Abu'l-Hasan Ali ibn Muhammad al-Qalasadi, Arab mathematician
- Ibn al-Durayhim, also named ʿAlī ibn Muḥammad, Arab writer and mathematician
- Abu Ali ibn Muhammad, king of the Ghurid dynasty
- Jalal al-Mulk Ali ibn Muhammad, ruler of Tripoli during the First Crusade
- Ibn Sufi, also called Ali ibn Muhammad, Shi'a genealogist
