= Idris II of Morocco =

Second Idrisid ruler from 803 to 828

Idris II إدريس الثاني
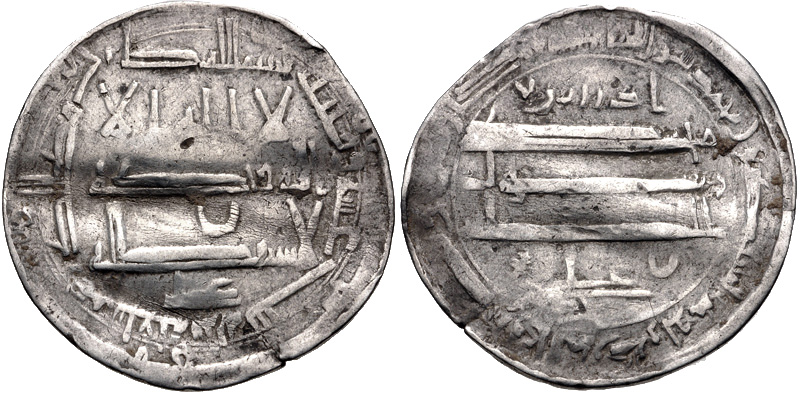
- Dirham of Idris II, minted 828 AD

Emir
- Reign: 803 – 828
- Predecessor: Idris I bin Abdullah
- Successor: Muhammad bin Idris
- Born: August 791; Walili, present-day Morocco
- Died: August 828; Fez, present-day Morocco
- Burial: Zawiya of Moulay Idris II, Fez
- Spouse: Hosna bint Sulaiman ben Mohammed al-Najai
- Issue: Muhammad ibn Idris; Gannuna bint Idris
Names
- Idris al-Azhar bin Idris bin Abdullah al-Kamil إدريس الْأَزْهَرَ بْن إدريس بْن عَبْدِ اللهِ الْكَامِلِ
- Dynasty: Idrisid
- Father: Idris I
- Mother: Kenza al-Awrabiya
- Religion: Islam

Idris II (Arabic: إدريس الثاني) (Note: Known as Idrīs ibn Idrīs (Arabic: إدريس بن إدريس); also known as Idrīs the Luminous (إدريس الأزهر Idrīs al-Azhar) or Idrīs the Younger (إدريس الأصغر Idrīs al-Aṣghar)) (August 791 – August 828), was an Arab Emir who was the son of Idris I, the founder of the Idrisid dynasty. He was born in Walili two months after the death of his father. He succeeded his father Idris I in 803.

== Biography ==
Idris II was born on August 791, two months after the death of Idris I in June 791. His mother was Kenza, his father's wife and the daughter of the Awraba tribe chieftain, Ishaq ibn Mohammed al-Awarbi. He was raised among the Berber Awraba tribe of Walili. In 803, he was proclaimed Imam in the mosque of Walila succeeding his father.

Of the Idrisid sultans, Idris II was one of the best educated. In the work of Ibn al-Abbar, correspondence between Idris II and his contemporary Aghlabid emir Ibrahim I ibn al-Aghlab is quoted in which he invites him to renounce his claims to his territories.

Idris II oversaw the arrival of two waves of Arab refugees from al-Andalus in 818 and Ifriqiya in 824–826, who settled mainly in the capital of Fez. Consequently, the Arabization of Morocco began throughout Idris II's reign, during which Fez became predominantly Arabic-speaking. Idris II was guarded by an Arab bodyguard and had an Arab minister named Umair bin Mus'ab.

Idris II led numerous successful expeditions and attacks against Kharijites, and by the end of his reign, the Idrisid realm included the area between the Shalif river in modern-day Algeria and the Sous in southern Morocco.

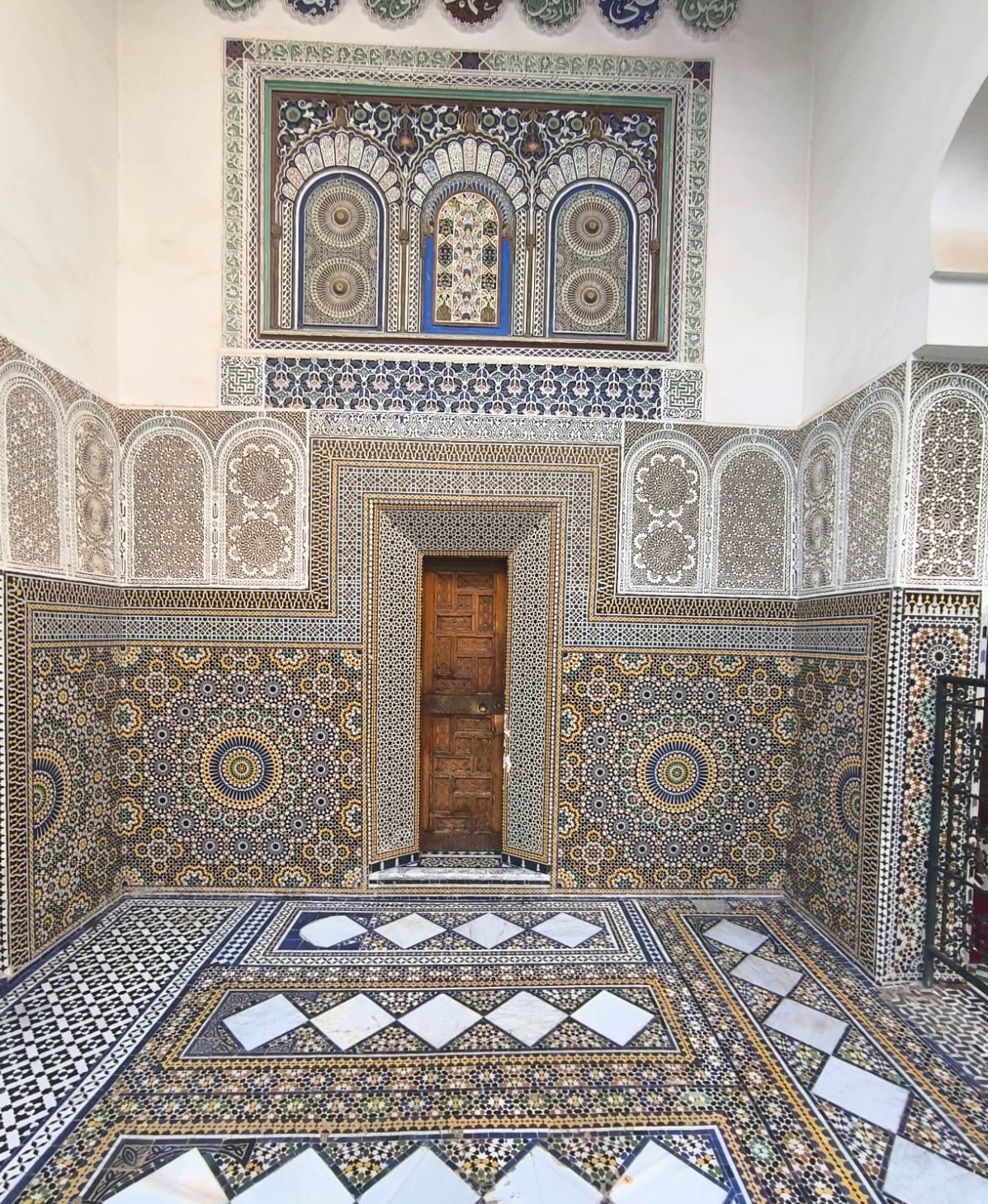
Shrine of Idriss II in Fez

Idris II died in Fes in 828. The Idrisid emirate was then divided into nine principalities ruled by his sons, with the eldest, Muhammad ibn Idris, ruling as the Emir from Fes. His grave is contained in the Zawiyya Moulay Idris in Fez. It was rediscovered under the Marinid Sultan Abd al-Haqq II in 1437, and became an important place of pilgrimage in the 15th century. It is, up till the present, considered the holiest place of Fez.

Preceded by Idris I	Emir; 803–828	Succeeded by Muhammad ibn Idris
