= Everett K. Rowson =

American scholar

Everett K. Rowson is an American scholar and Professor Emeritus of Middle Eastern and Islamic Studies at New York University. He is known for his works on the intellectual and social history of the medieval Islamic world. A festschrift in his honor edited by Joseph E. Lowry and Shawkat M. Toorawa was published by Brill Publishers in 2017.
