= Gudrun Krämer =

German scholar of Islamic history (born 1953)

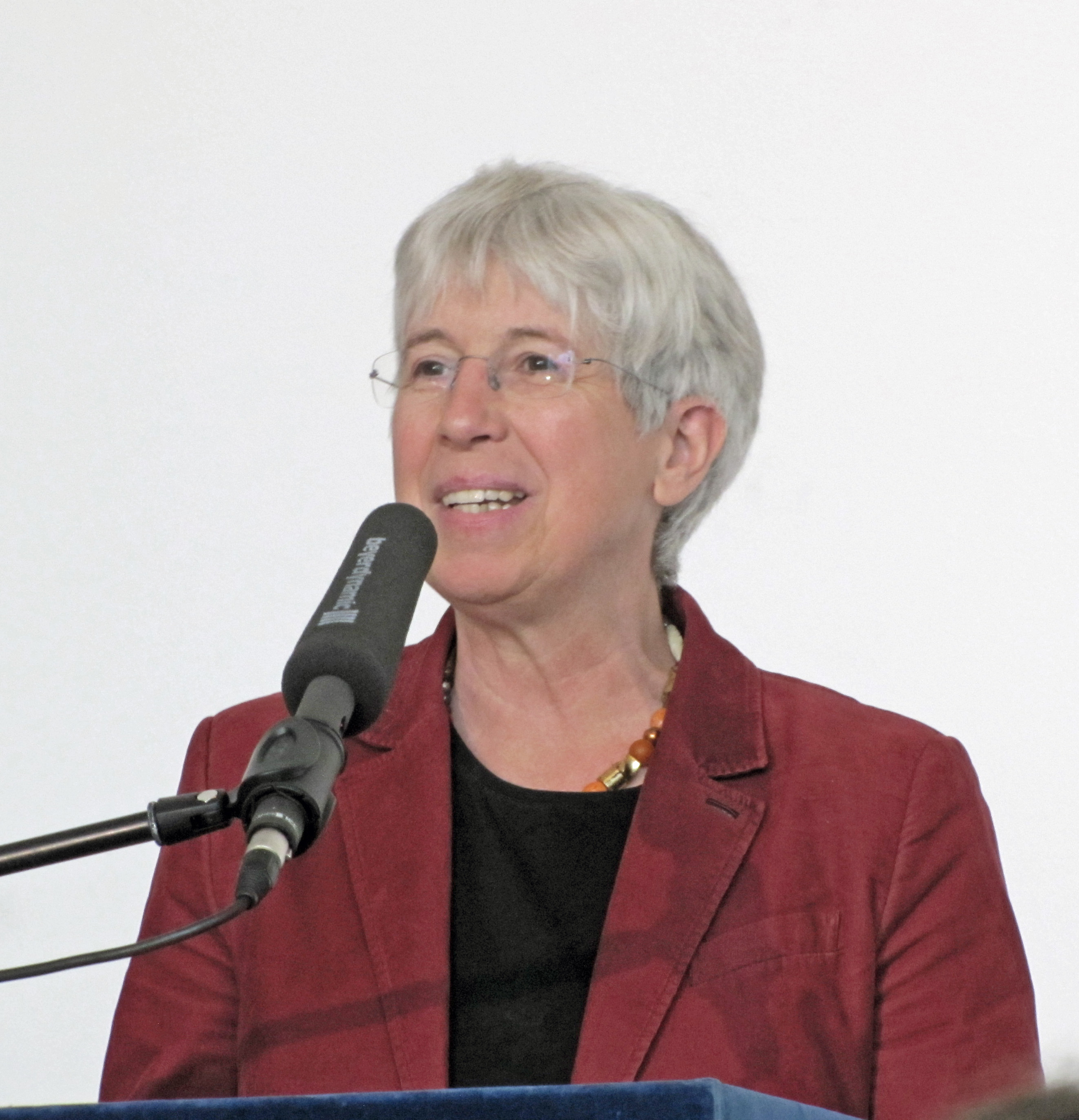

Gudrun Krämer (born 1953) is a German scholar of Islamic history and co-editor of the third edition of the Encyclopaedia of Islam. She is professor of Islamic studies, Chair of the Institute of Islamic Studies at the Free University of Berlin and a member of the Berlin-Brandenburg Academy of Sciences and Humanities. Her expertise is in topics related to modern Islamic history and in Islam, democracy, and modernity.

== Life ==
Kramer was born in 1953 in Marburg, Hesse. She received her doctorate from the University of Hamburg in 1982; her dissertation examined the history of the Jews in Egypt. She later worked as a researcher at the German Institute for International and Security Affairs and taught at the University of Bonn.

== Work ==
Kramer is noted as an analyst of Islamism from both a theological and textual standpoint, examining both the theoretical and practical implications of political Islam. In 2010, she was the first Islamic studies scholar to earn the International Research Prize from the Gerda Henkel Foundation due to the influence of her historical and cultural research on Muslims and its potential to explain current events.

=== English ===
- The Jews in Modern Egypt, 1914-1952, I.B. Tauris 1989
- A History of Palestine: From the Ottoman Conquest until the Creation of the State of Israel, Princeton University Press, 2008
- Hasan al-Banna, Oneworld Publications, 2010

=== French ===
- Responsabilité, égalité, pluralisme. Réflexions sur quelques notions-clés d'un ordre islamique moderne, Casablanca 2000

=== German ===
- Ägypten unter Mubarak: Identität und nationales Interesse, Nomos, 1986
- Gottes Staat als Republik: Reflexionen zeitgenössischer Muslime zu Islam, Menschenrechten und Demokratie, Nomos, 2000
- Geschichte Palästinas - Von der Osmanischen Eroberung bis zur Gründung des Staates Israel, Verlag C.H. Beck, 2002
- Geschichte des Islam, Verlag C.H. Beck, 2005
- Demokratie im Islam: Der Kampf für Toleranz und Freiheit in der arabischen Welt, C.H. Beck, 2011

=== Spanish ===
- Historia de Palestina. Desde la conquista otomana hasta la fundación del Estado de Israel, Siglo XXI, 2006
