= Victor Louis Ménage =

British historian and Turkologist (1920–2015)

Victor Louis Ménage (15 April 1920 – 11 June 2015) was a British historian, Turkologist, with a particular focus on the early Ottoman Empire and an editor of the Encyclopaedia of Islam.

Ménage described his experience of childhood poverty in Chislehurst, Kent from where study offered escape. A grant gained him a place at Eltham College (1930–1938). Encouraged by his teachers, he went on to Clare College, Cambridge University, to study Classics (1938–1940).

Although an opponent of war in 1940 World War II, he was enlisted into the military where he joined the ambulance service. At the end of the war, he was stationed in Ethiopia. After leaving the army, he accepted a teaching position in Addis Ababa. He later described this time as stimulating and pioneering. He transferred to the British Council at the end of the decade, when he met his future wife, Johannan.

Ménage produced several books and articles on Ottoman history over years working in research. In addition to teaching as professor of Turkish history at the University of London, he also edited and contributed chapters to the second edition of the Encyclopaedia of Islam .

Victor Louis Ménage died on 11 June 2015 in Sussex, England.
