= 2026 in paleoanthropology =

This article records significant discoveries and events related to paleoanthropology that occurred in 2026.

== Australopithecines ==
- Bettridge & Dunbar (2026) report evidence from experiments with time budget models developed for modern primates interpreted as indicating that the ecology of australopithecines was distinct from those of baboons and those of chimpanzees, recover the composite model with a chimpanzee feeding equation and a baboon moving equation as providing the best fit for known distribution of australopithecines, and argue that australopithecines would have been able to forage as large, cohesive social groups for protection against predators.
- Gat, Subsol & Braga (2026) compare the development of the cortical bone in the mandible during the early ontogeny of extant chimpanzees and humans and in fossil hominins, linking the robust morphology of the mandible of Paranthropus to a distinct developmental trajectory.
- Orr et al. (2026) provide a catalog of isolated postcranial remains of hominins from Drimolen (South Africa) collected between 1994 and 2015.
- New postcranial fossil material of hominins is reported from the Kromdraai fossil site (South Africa) by DeSilva et al. (2026).
- Alemseged et al. (2026) report the discovery of fossil material of Paranthropus from the Mille-Logya research area determined to be between 2.5 and 2.9-million-years-old, representing the first record of the genus in the Afar region of Ethiopia and one of the oldest records of a member of the genus reported to date.
- Rak & Kimbel (2026) interpret the prognathism observed in the specimen KNM WT 17000 as a derived rather than primitive trait, and interpret Australopithecus/Paranthropus aethiopicus as the probable sister taxon of Australopithecus/Paranthropus boisei.
- Thiebaut et al. (2026) describe the maxilla of a juvenile (3.5–5 years old at the time of death) specimen of Paranthropus boisei (OMO 362–10001) from the Shungura Formation (Ethiopia), and report evidence of development of a masticatory apparatus likely adapted to an adult-like diet in spite of young age of the studied individual.
- Critical reevaluation of the study of Zanolli et al. (2025) that placed the hominin specimen SK 15 from the Swartkrans cave (South Africa) in a previously unrecognized species of Paranthropus (P. capensis) is published by Clarke & Pickering (2026).
- Pickering & Clarke (2026) reevaluate claims of affinities of the hominin specimen SK 54 from the Swartkrans cave with members of the genus Homo made Braga et al. by (2023) and Martin et al. (2024), and argue that the specimen is more likely to be an individual of Paranthropus robustus.
- Evidence from the study of internal bone structure of tibiae and femora of Paranthropus robustus from Swartkrans and Australopithecus from Sterkfontein (South Africa), interpreted as indicative of different locomotor repertoires and likely distinct ecological niches of the studied hominins, is presented by Cazenave et al. (2026).
- O'Hara et al. (2026) report evidence of rapid evolution of the morphology of premolar teeth of Paranthropus robustus, interpreted as likely related to dietary pressures.
- Evidence of a comparable range of stress values on the pelvic floor of australopithecines and humans during birth is presented by Frémondière et al. (2026).
- Beaudet et al. (2026) present a digital reconstruction of the face of the Australopithecus specimen Stw 573 ("Little Foot").
- Hershkovitz et al. (2026) report evidence of greater similarity of the vertebral apophyseal ring of Lucy (and likely spinal biomechanics of the studied individual) to those of extant African apes than to those of modern humans, and interpret this finding as indicative of emergence of fully modern human gait later in the hominin evolution.
- A study on the geochronology of the Taung site (South Africa) and on the morphology and ecology of the Taung Child is published by Macho et al. (2026), who also study the morphological variation of the African Plio-Pleistocene hominins, finding no evidence supporting clear delineation of Australopithecus africanus, and interpret the observed diversity of hominins from southern Africa as likely resulting from changing climatic conditions leading to biogeographic boundary shifts, from range expansion of hominins resulting from tracking suitable habitats, and from complex population dynamics that might have included hybridization.
- Hatala et al. (2026) describe approximately 1.43-million-years-old hominin footprints from northern Kenya produced by a group that included multiple adult males, preserving a morphology similar to footprints attributed to Paranthropus boisei, but produced by hominins larger than known representatives of that species.

== Early Homo ==
- Evidence indicating that the evolution cranial morphological variation in members of the genus Homo was primarily influenced by selective constraints, their releases and by stabilizing selection rather than by gradual directional selection is presented by Hubbe & Harvati (2026).
- Blasi-Toccacceli et al. (2026) describe fossil material of a 1.84-million-years-old member of the genus Homo from the Shungura Formation (Ethiopia), including the oldest well-preserved shoulder and arm bones of a member of this genus, interpreted as indicative of reduction of use of arms in arboreal locomotion early in the evolution of Homo.
- The most complete skeleton of Homo habilis reported to date is described from the upper Burgi Member of the Koobi Fora Formation (Kenya) by Grine et al. (2026).
- Cofran, Hurst & Hawks (2026) present a virtual reconstruction of the brain endocast of Homo naledi, providing evidence of presence of a combination of ancestral and derived features in the brain of the studied hominin.
- Madupe et al. (2026) determine the sex of at least 20 individuals of Homo naledi from the Rising Star cave system (Cradle of Humankind, South Africa) on the basis of proteomic analysis of tooth enamel, finding no evidence of male markers in the studied sample.
- Delagnes et al. (2026) study the mobility of Early Pleistocene hominins from the Lower Omo Valley (Shungura Formation, Ethiopia), providing evidence of transport of quartz for the production of Oldowan stone tools from the alluvial fans of the Hamar Range, over 10 km from the sites preserving the stone tools, located in areas that lacked stone material but had rich faunal assemblages.
- Evidence from the study of Oldowan tools from the Shungura Formation, indicating that different sediment types produced characteristic wear of the studied tools that can be distinguished wear caused by other types of sediment and from anthropogenic use-wear, is presented by Galland et al. (2026).
- Dominguez-Rodrigo et al. (2026) report the discovery of a new site (Emiliano Aguirre Korongo) at Olduvai Gorge (Tanzania) preserving proboscidean remains with bone modifications interpreted as the authors as evidence of butchery assisted by stone tools, and interpret the fossil record of megafaunal bone modifications at Olduvai Gorge as consistent with more frequent and widespread megafaunal butchery after 1.8 million years ago, roughly coinciding with the replacement of Oldowan industries by Acheulean ones.
- Evidence from the study of burnt bones of small mammals from the Acheulean deposits from the Wonderwerk Cave (South Africa), indicative of repeated use of fire by Early Pleistocene hominins, is presented by Marin-Monfort et al. (2026).
- Evidence from the study of an approximately 1.6 million years old assemblage of associated hominin fossils and butchered fauna from the KBS Member of the Koobi Fora Formation, indicative of consistent foraging strategies of early Homo across time and in different environments, is presented by Forrest et al. (2026).
- Evidence of variability of morphology and production of Acheulean handaxes from Melka Kunture (Ethiopia) is provided by Méndez-Quintas et al. (2026).
- Campo-Gómez et al. (2026) determine prey carrying capacity and total biomass of the Early Pleistocene large mammal community available to hominins from the Sima del Elefante site (Spain), interpreted as capable of sustaining hominin groups of low density.
- Wang et al. (2026) study the morphology of lumbar vertebrae of immature individuals of Homo erectus and Australopithecus sediba from Georgia, Kenya and South Africa, reporting evidence of establishment of vertebral traits related to bipedal locomotion early in hominin ontogeny and evolution.
- Evidence indicating that Early to Middle Pleistocene hominins from the northern Indian Subcontinent lived in a mosaic environment dominated by savannas is presented by Kaur et al. (2026).
- Tu et al. (2026) determine the three crania of Homo erectus from the Yunxian site (Hubei, China) to be approximately 1.77 million years old, representing the oldest securely dated hominin fossils from eastern Asia reported to date.
- Gousset et al. (2026) study the phylogenetic relationships of Homo luzonensis, and interpret the studied hominin as most likely originating from an Asian population of Homo erectus, resulting in evolutionary reversals in an insular context and likely caused by living in tropical environment.
- A study on the technological characteristics of the stone tools from the Rizal Archaeological Site (Philippines) is published by Guibert et al. (2026).
- Li et al. (2026) report a new Lower Paleolithic site with stone tools and animal remains (the Daanmiao site) in the Bailong River valley (Gansu, China) providing evidence of hominin occupation of western Qinling Mountain Ranges approximately 900,000 years ago, and evidence of more favorable habitat for early hominins in the studied area than in other parts of North China during the Mid-Pleistocene Transition.
- Shao et al. (2026) determine two hominin crania from the Hulu Cave (China) to likely fall within a similar chronological range and date them to Marine Isotope Stage 16.
- Sørensen et al. (2026) provide an absolute chronological framework for the Early Paleolithic Karatau Culture from the Khovaling Loess Plateau (Tajikistan).
- Fu et al. (2026) recover ancient enamel proteins from individuals of Homo erectus from the Middle Pleistocene Zhoukoudian, Hexian and Sunjiadong sites (China), reporting the discovery of an amino acid variant that was previously identified in Denisovans, and argue that super-archaic introgressed DNA identified in Denisovan genome as likely introduced through contact with populations related to Late Middle Pleistocene H. erectus from East Asia.
- Fossil evidence of presence of Homo erectus in closed rainforest environments in southern China between 324,000 and 184,000 years ago is presented by Liao et al. (2026) and Westaway et al. (2026).
- Evidence from taphonomic analyses of remains of Stegodon from Liang Bua (Flores, Indonesia), indicating that Komodo dragons had primary access to Stegodon carcasses and that Homo floresiensis likely scavenged on low-utility elements left by Komodo dragons, is presented by Veatch et al. (2026), who find no evidence of intentional use of fire by Homo floresiensis.
- A study on the pelvis of the holotype individual of Homo floresiensis, reporting evidence of similarities to members of the genus Homo consistent with human-like bipedalism, is published by Lewton et al. (2026).
- Kaifu et al. (2026) report evidence of marked deformational plagiocephaly in individuals of Homo erectus and Homo floresiensis, and interpret it as likely linked to presence of modern human-like helpless infancy in the studied hominins.
- Evidence from the study of charcoal from the Gesher Benot Ya'aqov site (Israel), interpreted as indicative of habitual gathering of firewood by early Middle Pleistocene hominins (likely from available driftwood), is presented by Allué et al. (2026).
- Evidence of a consistent pattern of basalt acquisition by the Middle Pleistocene hominins for the production of Acheulian tools from the Gesher Benot Ya'aqov site, including evidence for different mode of procurement of basalt for the production of handaxes and cleavers, is presented by Golan, Ben Dor & Goren-Inbar (2026).
- Evidence of selective procurement of flint by Middle Pleistocene hominins from the Gesher Benot Ya'aqov site, as well as evidence of stability of their procurement preferences throughout 50,000 years, is presented by Ekshtain et al. (2026).
- Liu et al. (2026) reconstruct climate changes in northeastern China throughout the last 800,000 years, and find that changes of subsistence patterns and hunting technologies of Paleolithic hominins from the studied area coincided with a shift towards cooler and drier climate after the Mid-Brunhes Event.
- A study on animals remains from the Caijiagou-C site in the Nihewan Basin (China), providing evidence of systematic processing of ungulate carcasses by early Middle Pleistocene hominins that involved diverse butchery stages, is published by Du et al. (2026).
- Evidence supporting the reliability of dating of hominin traces from the Quesang site (China) described by Zhang et al. (2021) to the Middle Pleistocene is presented by Gao et al. (2026).
- A study on stone tool production strategies of Middle Pleistocene hominins from the Notarchirico site (Italy) throughout approximately 100,000 years is published by Moncel et al. (2026).
- A study on Acheulean tools from the Revilleja de Valparaíso (Spain), interpreted as indicative of presence of diverse technological traditions with distinct origins in Western Europe around 700,000 years ago, is published by García-Vadillo et al. (2026).
- Approximately 430,000-years-old wooden tools are identified from the Marathousa site in the Megalopolis Basin (Greece) by Milks et al. (2026).
- The conclusions about age of the Petralona skull from the study of Falguères et al. (2025) are contested by Kostopoulos & Lazaridis (2026) and reaffirmed by Falguères et al. (2026).
- Martín-Francés et al. (2026) interpret the molar wear in the Sima de los Huesos hominins as suggestive of a mixed diet including similar proportions of meat and plant foods.
- Parfitt & Bello (2026) describe a 480,000-years-old knapping tool made on an elephant bone from the Boxgrove Palaeolithic site (United Kingdom), representing the oldest case of an elephant bone being used as a raw material in Europe reported to date.
- Nicoud et al. (2026) study the chronology of bifacial occurrences from Valle Giumentina (Italy), reporting evidence of shifts in the biface structure within two levels from Marine Isotope Stage 12, and interpret evidence from the studied site as consistent with repeated reinventions of the biface in Europe during the Lower Paleolithic.
- A study on the Acheulean handaxe variability in southeastern Britain, interpreted as consistent with presence of distinct regional cultural groups during the Marine Isotope Stage 11, is published by White et al. (2026).
- García-Martínez et al. (2026) provide the first proteomics-based sex identification of a hominin tooth from the Middle Pleistocene of western Europe, using the analysis of the presence of amelogenin to attribute a hominin molar from the Middle Pleistocene site of Ruidera (Spain) to a male individual.
- Rosas et al. (2026) review different models of evolution of European hominins during the Middle Pleistocene (including evolutionary models including all European population in the lineage ancestral to Neanderthals and the models proposing coexistence of multiple contemporaneous lineages in Europe) and the analytical frameworks supporting these models.
- García-Martínez et al. (2026) report the discovery of a parietal bone from a new paleoanthropological site Ruidera (Spain), providing evidence of variability of cranial morphology of Middle Pleistocene hominins.
- Yue et al. (2026) report evidence of production of diverse stone tools at the Xigou site (Henan, China) between 160,000 and 72,000 years ago, including evidence of well-organised core reduction strategies, production of diverse small flake-based tools, and hafted implements.
- The earliest evidence of use of sophisticated, systematic centripetal flaking systems in eastern Asia known to date is reported from the late Middle Pleistocene Lingjing site (Henan, China) by Zhao et al. (2026).

== Neanderthals and Denisovans ==
- Siemssen et al. (2026) report evidence of antibacterial properties of birch tar produced with methods used in Europe during the Middle Paleolithic.
- Guil-Guerrero (2026) argues that consumption of fly larvae by Neanderthals postulated by Beasley, Lesnik & Speth (2025) does not by itself explain nitrogen isotope enrichment observed in Neanderthal collagen, interpreted as more likely to be primarily caused by targeted hunting and consumption of megafauna by Neanderthals.
- Evidence from the study of bone microanatomy of Neanderthal remains from Sesselfelsgrotte (Germany), indicative of an overall similar growth trajectory of Neanderthals and modern humans during their early life, is presented by Miszkiewicz et al. (2026), who also report the presence of probably pathological interglobular dentin in the studied fossil material that might be evidence of a metabolic bone disease.
- Zollikofer et al. (2026) compare the morphology of Neanderthal pelves from Sima de las Palomas (Spain) and Dederiyeh Cave (Syria) with those of modern humans, reporting evidence of morphological similarities of pelvic regions associated with childbirth, as well as evidence of differences in pelvic regions associated with locomotion.
- Sorrentino et al. (2026) report evidence of presence of overall more robust calcaneus in Neanderthals compared to modern humans, with the closest similarity to calcanei of highly mobile, unshod modern human groups.
- Pott et al. (2026) apply a robotic-assisted total knee arthroplasty planning to a model of a Neanderthal individual from the Spy Cave (Belgium) to reconstruct alignment of leg bones and articular morphology of this individual, and report evidence of a markedly varus alignment similar to modern human phenotypes associated with participation in weight-bearing activities.
- Verheijen et al. (2026) study evidence of Neanderthal activity in faunal remains from the Lehringen site (Germany), reporting evidence of defleshing of a straight-tusked elephant when its carcass was in fresh state and evidence of butchery of a beaver, bear and aurochs.
- Evidence indicating that exploitation of shellfish by Neanderthals occupying the Cave of Los Aviones (Spain) happened primarily during the colder months of the year is presented by García-Escárzaga et al. (2026).
- A study on Neanderthal teeth from the Chagyrskaya Cave in the Altai Mountains (Russia), indicating that the studied sample overall falls within the known Neanderthal phenotypic variability but also preserves specific morphological traits, is published by Gicqueau et al. (2026).
- Massilani et al. (2026) present a high-quality genome of an approximately 110,000-years-old Neanderthal individual from the Denisova Cave (Russia), providing evidence of a closer relationship of the studied individual to a 120,000-years-old Neanderthal from the same cave than to a 80,000-years-old individual from the Chagyrskaya Cave or to European Neanderthals, evidence of gene flow from Denisovans in both Neanderthals from the Denisova Cave, and evidence of differentiation between Altai and European Neanderthals comparable to that of the most differentiated populations of modern humans.
- Zubova et al. (2026) report evidence of deliberate invasive dental caries intervention in a 59,000-years-old Neanderthal molar from the Chagyrskaya Cave.
- Evidence from the study of rhinocerotid remains from Middle Paleolithic sites in France and Spain, interpreted as consistent with use of rhinoceros teeth as tools (including soft hammers and anvils) by Neanderthals, is presented by Sanz-Royo et al. (2026).
- Picin et al. (2026) report new mitogenomes of at least 7 Neanderthal individuals from the Stajnia Cave (Poland), interpreted as likely dating to Marine Isotope Stage 5, find that the studied individual carried mitochondrial DNA lineages related to those Western Europe and the northern Caucasus, and interpret their findings as possible evidence of a widespread mitochondrial DNA lineage that was subsequently replaced by the mtDNA found in late Neanderthals.
- Evidence of exploitation of European pond turtles by Neanderthals occupying the Neumark-Nord site (Germany) during the Last Interglacial is presented by Gaudzinski-Windheuser et al. (2026).
- Palancar et al. (2026) provide evidence of a clear morphological distinction between axes of Neanderthals and modern humans on the basis of the study of a Neanderthal axis from the Sidrón Cave (Spain).
- Evidence from the study of metacarpal remains from the Sidrón Cave indicative of differences of metacarpal morphology of Neanderthals and modern humans is presented by Rosas et al. (2026).
- Rodrigo et al. (2026) provide evidence from the study of animal remains from the Fumane Cave (Italy) indicative of a structured subsistence strategy of Neanderthals occupying the site, including processing of carcasses at kill locations and selective transport of high-yield portions of the carcasses into the cave for secondary processing.
- A diverse assemblage of wooden objects produced by Neanderthals, including weapons, domestic objects and structural elements, is documented from the Middle Paleolithic site of Abric Romaní (Spain) by Saladié et al. (2026).
- Burke et al. (2026) determine the distribution of habitats suitable for Neanderthals and modern humans in Europe during stadial and interstadial events of Marine Isotope Stage 3, providing evidence of a shift but not complete disappearance of habitats suitable for Neanderthals as a result of climate changes, weak connectivity between optimal regions for Neanderthals, and overlaps between optimal regions of the two hominins.
- A Neanderthal infant assigned to the 6- to 14-month age range, providing evidence of rapid somatic growth in early life of Neanderthals, is described from the Amud Cave (Israel) by Been et al. (2026).
- Pomeroy et al. (2026) describe skeletal remains of a new Neanderthal individual from the Shanidar Cave (Iraq), expanding the Neanderthal burial cluster known from this cave, and preserving evidence of a severe but non-fatal facial injury, as well as evidence of perforation of the scapula interpreted as perimortem injury likely caused by a projectile or a spear.
- Blinkhorn et al. (2026) study the variability of Levallois blanks from northeast Africa and southwest Asia, and interpret Levallois stone tools from northern Arabia dating to early Marine Isotope Stage 3 as likely produced by Neanderthals.
- Evidence from the study of palynological assemblages from the Axlor site (Spain), indicative of marked shifts in landscape structure at the time of the Neanderthal occupation of the site, is presented by Pérez-Díaz et al. (2026).
- Evidence of short-term Neanderthal occupations of the Eirós cave (Spain), indicative of high mobility of late Neanderthal communities from northwestern Iberian Peninsula, is presented by Rodríguez-Álvarez et al. (2026).
- Fotiadou et al. (2026) reconstruct the demographic history of late Neanderthals on the basis of data from mitochondrial DNA, reporting evidence indicating that nearly all late Neanderthals from Europe belonged to a single mitochondrial DNA lineage, likely as a result of expansion across Europe from a refugium in southwestern France, and evidence of rapid decline in the effective population size of late Neanderthals shortly before their extinction; Sánchez Goñi & d'Errico (2026) link the presence of the refugium in southwestern France to the climatic configuration affecting western Europe 76,000 to 68,000 years ago.
- Bossoms Mesa et al. (2026) reconstruct the genetic diversity of late Neanderthals from Belgium and France, finding no evidence of mating among close relatives or genetic deterioration prior to Neanderthal extinction.
- Yousefi et al. (2026) study changes in suitability and connectivity of Neanderthal habitat through time, and find no evidence of habitat fragmentation caused by climate changes before Neanderthal extinction.
- Vidal-Cordasco, Rodríguez-Gómez & Marín-Arroyo (2026) report evidence indicating that, although climate-driven changes of the maximum sustainable population densities of Neanderthals might have resulted in range reduction of Neanderthals and their regional extinctions, environmental changes would have been unlikely to cause a complete Neanderthal extinction without the appearance of modern humans.
- Baykara et al. (2026) report evidence of sequential occupation of the Üçağızlı II Cave (Turkey) by Neanderthals and modern humans, and evidence of cultural continuity between members of the two human lineages occupying the site.
- Schoenemann et al. (2026) interpret differences in brain anatomy of Neanderthals and modern humans as falling within the range of differences between modern human populations, and find no evidence of significang cognitive differences between Neanderthals and modern humans that might have contributed to Neanderthal extinction.
- Platt, Harris & Tishkoff (2026) reconstruct likely patterns of interbreeding between Neanderthals and anatomically modern humans on the basis of the study of their X chromosomes, interpreted as indicating that their interbreeding predominantly involved Neanderthal men mating with anatomically modern women.
- Evidence from the study of Middle and Upper Paleolithic assemblages, indicating that overall anatomically modern human occupations can be distinguished from Neanderthal ones on the basis of tighter and more cohesive clusters of archaeological remains, is presented by Merino-Pelaz & Cobo-Sánchez (2026).
- Evidence of utility of the study of nonmetric traits at the enamel-dentine junction for distinguishing teeth of Neanderthals and modern humans is presented by Becam, Chevalier & Colard (2026).
- Kanis et al. (2026) identify amino acid changes in the growth hormone receptor of Neanderthals, including a change driving faster cell growth, and report evidence of more muscle mass in modern humans who inherited the gene encoding the Neanderthal growth hormone receptor through admixture.
- Evidence of effectiveness of the imputation in detection of Neanderthal and Denisovan ancestry in low-coverage ancient genomes is presented by Capodiferro et al. (2026) .
- Rudaya, Kozlikin & Shunkov (2026) study vegetation and climate dynamics in the northwestern Altai from Marine Isotope Stage 9 to MIS 2, at the time of presence of Denisovans and Neanderthals in the studied area, and interpret them as indicative of ecological generalism of Denisovans and specialization of late Neanderthals to life in open steppe landscapes.
- Rao et al. (2026) identify bone fragments and teeth from the Pleistocene strata from the Bianfu Cave (Yunnan, China) as Denisovan remains, while Ruan et al. (2026) study archaeological remains associated with Denisovan fossils from the Bianfu Cave, interpreted as indicative of specialized hunting, expedient production of stone tools and extensive use of unmodified bones by Denisovans.
- Evidence from palaeoproteomic analysis and from the study of morphology of the hominin material from Xujiayao and other Middle Pleistocene members of the genus Homo from eastern Asia, indicating that the Xujiayao, Dali, Jinniushan and Hualongdong hominins were members of the Denisovan lineage and indicative of a distinctive cranial morphology of Denisovans, is presented by Xing et al. (2026).
- Cabrera (2026) argues that the available evidence of phylogenetic affinities of modern humans and their closest relatives is most consistent with a sister group relationship between modern humans and Neanderthals, with Denisovans more distantly related to modern humans.

== Modern humans ==
- Zhang et al. (2026) present a new method for identification of evidence of archaic ancestry in modern human genomes, and report evidence of an introgression from an unknown archaic lineage into the ancestors of modern humans before their migration out of Africa.
- Evidence of impact of the population dynamics of pre-Neolithic hunter-gatherers and Neolithic farmers on patterns of Neanderthal ancestry observed in the studied European populations is provided by Tsoupas et al. (2026).
- Hublin et al. (2026) report the discovery of new, approximately 773,000-years-old hominin fossils from Grotte à Hominidés at Thomas Quarry I in Casablanca (Morocco), close in age to Homo antecessor but morphologically distinct from members of this species, preserving a combination of primitive and derived traits seen in Eurasian archaic hominins and in Homo sapiens.
- Moraes et al. (2026) present a facial approximation of early humans from Jebel Irhoud (Morocco) on the basis of a three-dimensional composite skull.
- Evidence from the study of a stratified sequence of lithic assemblages ranging from Acheulian to the Middle Stone Age from the Amanzi Springs archaeological site (South Africa), indicative of emergence of the Middle Stone Age in the studied area around 230,000 years ago, is presented by Blackwood et al. (2026).
- Evidence of consistent and specialized extraction of hornfels for the production of stone tools between 220,000 and 110,000 years ago is reported from the Jojosi site (South Africa) by Will et al. (2026).
- Ecker et al. (2026) report evidence of environmental changes during the occupation of the Florisbad archaeological and paleontological site (South Africa) by early modern humans, including evidence of changes of composition of local plant assemblages.
- A study on the origin of stone used for production of Middle Stone Age tools from Ethiopia, interpreted as indicative of mobility and connectivity of Middle Stone Age populations from the Main Ethiopian Rift and the Afar Rift, is published by Habte, Shackley & Sahle (2026).
- Beyene et al. (2026) report the discovery of approximately 100,000-years-old human skeletons and Middle Stone Age artifacts from the Halibee member of the Dawaitoli Formation (Ethiopia), interpreted as preserved in a wooded depositional environment with seasonal flooding.
- Zimmer et al. (2026) interpret the morphological variation of Middle Stone Age human mandibles from the Klasies River Main Site (South Africa) as not conclusively indicative of presence of more than one population lineage.
- García-Morato et al. (2026) reconstruct climate and vegetation changes in southern Africa from Marine Isotope Stage 5 to Marine Isotope Stage 3, and find that the emergence of the 76,000-67,000-years-old Stilbaai lithic technocomplex coincided with humid, cool phase that likely supported high biomass and expanded habitable zones, while the 64,000-60,000 years of Howiesons Poort technocomplex arose and ended during peaks of aridity, with a wetter interval midway through them.
- Evidence from the study of engraved ostrich eggshell fragments from the Howiesons Poort technocomplex, indicating that the studied engravings represent an expression of complex graphic representation by Middle Stone Age humans, is presented by Decembrini et al. (2026).
- A study on ochre-rich sediments from the Klipdrift Shelter (South Africa), providing evidence of mixing of proteins derived from the common eland with ochre powder by the Middle Stone Age humans, is published by Haghighi et al. (2026).
- Evidence from the study of human-accumulated bone assemblages from the Middle and Later Stone Age sites in South Africa and Lesotho, indicative of a shift in the composition of the studied accumulations of human prey towards smaller species through time, is presented by Ben-Dor & Barkai (2026).
- Alichane et al. (2026) study the morphology of the enamel-dentine junction of the first and second molars in hominins associated with the Middle Stone Age Aterian technocomplexes in northwestern Africa, reporting evidence of overall closer morphological similarity to anatomically modern humans than to Neanderthals, but also evidence of morphological differences that might be related to the age and large size of the studied teeth.
- A study on use wear of Aterian tools from the Bizmoune Cave (Morocco), interpreted as indicative of a diverse range of domestic and subsistence activities, is published by Djellal et al. (2026).
- Evidence of application of poison derived from plants (likely from Boophone disticha) on the tips of 60,000-years-old arrowhead from the Umhlatuzana Rock Shelter (South Africa) is presented by Isaksson, Högberg & Lombard (2026).
- Arlt (2026) determines the Robberg stone tool tradition in southern Africa to span the internal from 24.800 to 9.700 years ago rather than from 18.000 to 12.000 years ago, and reports evidence of a more gradual transition between Robberg and Oakhurst technocomplexes than indicated by earlier studies.
- Zorrilla-Revilla (2026) reports evidence from the study of Late Pleistocene human tracks from the Engare Sero site (Tanzania) indicating that the pace the trackmaker group might have been adjusted to accommodate the energetic efficiency of women and nonadults constituting the majority within the group.
- Review of research on the origin and on the course of global spread of Homo sapiens out of Africa from the preceding years is published by Groucutt (2026).
- Clarkson et al. (2026) report megafaunal remains and Levallois assemblages from the 'Uruq Aljelibah site (Saudi Arabia) interpreted as evidence of human occupation of the shore of Mundafan paleolake approximately 125,000 years ago that involved processing of megafaunal carcasses and production of tools (including poisoned hunting weapons).
- Pantoja-Pérez et al. (2026) identify dental and bone abnormalities in the mandible of Qafzeh 25 as likely caused by sharp object trauma, and report evidence of survival of the studied individual after the injury.
- Litov, Ben-Dor & Barkai (2026) interpret the decline of use of in heavy-duty tools in Levant after the Lower-Middle Paleolithic transition, coinciding with decline of megaherbivores in the studied region, as indicating that the studied tools were primarily used for processing of large prey.
- Abbas et al. (2026) provide evidence from the study of riverine wetland environments from the Hamra Faddan and Wadi al-Hasa localities from the eastern margin of the Jordan Rift Valley interpreted as indicating that southern Levant provided a stable environmental niche that sustained human populations from the late Middle Paleolithic to the Upper Paleolithic.
- A study on the Middle Paleolithic and Middle Stone Age occupation of the Rub' al Khali, providing evidence of links between early human settlement of the southern Arabian Peninsula and accessibility of both water and stones suitable for tool production, is published by Dellmour et al. (2026).
- Zhao et al. (2026) study the morphology of hominin limb bones from the Salawusu site (China), finding no evidence of diagnostic features of the Neanderthal lineage, and reporting morphological evidence consistent with affinities with modern humans.
- Li et al. (2026) report evidence from the study of the palynological record from the East China Sea continental shelf spanning the past 71,000 years indicative of presence of a cool, dry temperate grassland biome during the lowstand intervals (including the Last Glacial Maximum), as well as evidence of presence of an open-forest landscape during the milder conditions of the Marine Isotope Stage 3, and interpret their findings as supporting the interpretation of the exposed East China Sea continental shelf as a habitat facilitating the initial dispersal of early modern humans into East Asia.
- Zhang et al. (2026) study the features of stone tools from the Nwya Devu site (China), reporting evidence of differences from stone tool assemblages from northern Initial Upper Paleolithic sites, and interpret tools from the Nwya Devu site as either representing a regional variant of Initial Upper Paleolithic technology or resulting from a separate dispersal of blade technologies into East Asia.
- Totsuka et al. (2026) reconstruct the chronology of early Upper Paleolithic sites in Japan, and report evidence of rapid increase in the number of sites between 36,000 and 34,000 years ago that was likely linked to growth of the human population size.
- Oktaviana et al. (2026) provide age estimates for Pleistocene rock art (hand stencils, human figures and non-figurative, geometric motifs) from southeastern Sulawesi (Indonesia) and determine the calcite overlying a hand stencil from Liang Metanduno on Muna Island to be at least 67,800 years old, representing the oldest demonstrated minimum-age constraints for parietal art worldwide reported to date, and interpreted as the oldest known archaeological evidence for the presence of Homo sapiens in Wallacea.
- Ruff et al. (2026) describe a Late Pleistocene human femur from Wajak (Java, Indonesia), calculate body mass and stature of the studied individual and compare them with data on other Late Pleistocene individuals from East Asia, reporting evidence of greater body mass and relative body breadth in individuals from higher latitudes.
- Borreggine et al. (2026) reconstruct likely timing and paths of early human migration from Sundaland into Sahul, and find northern routes of migration to be more likely than southern when changes of sea level and ocean currents are taken into account.
- Evidence of exploitation of a broad range of resources by humans occupying the Inumaki Cave on Biak (Indonesia) during the Last Glacial Maximum is presented by Tolla et al. (2026).
- Brumm et al. (2026) identify dental pathologies in late Pleistocene and Holocene human remains from the Leang Bulu Bettue and Leang Cappalombo 1 sites (Sulawesi, Indonesia) interpreted as consistent with use of areca nuts as drugs by the studied individuals through sucking on intact nuts.
- Evidence from the Madjedbebe site indicative of complex acquisition and processing of ochre by humans living in northern Australia throughout the last 65,000 years is presented by Clarkson et al. (2026).
- Allen et al. (2026) study the visibility of fallow deer in broad-leaved woodland environment, and interpret purported hunting lesions on fossil bones of fallow deer as placed in areas that would be visible to Palaeolithic hunters in such environments.
- Evidence indicating that Aurignacian artifacts from cave sites in southwestern Germany were adorned with geometric sign sequences of comparable complexity to that of early proto-cuneiform is presented by Bentz & Dutkiewicz (2026).
- Conard, Janas & Zeidi (2026) report the discovery of two Aurignacian bird figurines made from mammoth ivory in the Hohle Fels cave (Germany).
- Isle de Beauchaine et al. (2026) study the morphology of teeth in the Aurignacian mandible Les Rois 2 from the Les Rois cave (Charente, France), interpreted as consistent with assignment of the specimen to an anatomically modern human.
- Evidence from the study of genome-wide data from skeletal remains from Isturitz Cave (France), Cave of Chufín (Spain) and Ostuni Cave (Italy), indicative of a previously undetected gene flow between early Gravettian populations from Europe, is presented by Gelabert et al. (2026).
- Bossoms Mesa et al. (2026) report evidence of preservation of human DNA in pigment samples collected in and around Paleolithic rock art, including preservation of DNA resulting from deposition through direct human contact in the Escoural Cave (Portugal).
- A study on the age of the carbonate thin layers covering or underlying rock art from the Cave of Altamira (Spain), providing evidence of several periods of cave art from the ceiling of the studied cave, is published by Pons-Branchu et al. (2026).
- Evidence from the Velika Pećina, Velika Vranovica and Pećina kod Stene cave sites (Serbia), indicative of human presence in central Balkans during the Last Glacial Maximum, is presented by Kuhn et al. (2026).
- Masojć et al. (2026) describe a Late Pleistocene human tooth from the Khutul Usny Cave site, representing the first fossil of an early Homo sapiens in Mongolia with secure geological context and providing evidence of presence of the species in southern Mongolia around the onset of the Last Glacial Maximum.
- A study on the frontal and mandibular morphology of the Red Deer Cave people, interpreted as consistent of affinities with Homo sapiens and indicative of diversity cranial morphology of late Pleistocene hominins from eastern Asia, is published by Fan et al. (2026).
- Evidence indicating that Solutrean artifacts from the Peña Capón rock shelter (Muriel-Tamajón, Spain) were sourced 600 to 700 kilometers away from this site, in the present-day territory of southwest France, is presented by Sánchez de la Torre et al. (2026).
- Nash et al. (2026) report rediscovery of putative Upper Paleolithic cave art from the Bacon Hole site (Wales, United Kingdom) originally discovered by William Sollas and Henri Breuil in 1912 and support the interpretation of the studied horizontal lines as cave art.
- Reiche et al. (2026) determine the age of the carbon black-based figures in the rock art from the Font-de-Gaume cave (France) on the basis of chemical imaging and radiocarbon dating.
- Parfitt et al. (2026) identify an Upper Paleolithic pendant made out of a polished seal tooth from the Kents Cavern (United Kingdom), which was an inland site during the Magdalenian occupation.
- Evidence from the study of ivory figurines from the Upper Paleolithic site Mizyn (Ukraine), indicating that geometric ornamentation of the studied figurines was influenced by natural patterns within mammoth ivory, is presented by Radchenko et al. (2026).
- Chamberlain et al. (2026) study the morphology of the cast of the possible Upper Palaeolithic hominin cranium from Cannstatt (Germany), argued in the past to be a possible representative of a distinct hominin lineage, and interpret the studied individual as most likely to be an anatomically modern human.
- Allaby et al. (2026) reconstruct the environment of the Southern River system in southern Doggerland on the basis of sedimentological and sedimentary ancient DNA, and report evidence indicating that early colonization of Doggerland was facilitated by presence of northern refugia during the early Mesolithic.
- Springer et al. (2026) reconstruct environmental conditions faced by tracemakers of the White Sands footprints, reporting evidence of a complete floral turnover and a large aridification episode during the Last Glacial Maximum.
- A study on 13,800-years-old osseous and stone artifacts from the Shég’ Xdaltth’í’ site (Alaska, United States), providing evidence of similarities of the studied artifacts with findings from western Beringia and from Paleoindian complexes in temperate North America, is published by Graf et al. (2026).
- Evidence indicating that early Paleo-Indians from eastern Beringia, North American Clovis complex and South American Fishtail Projectile Point complex were dietary specialists feeding on Pleistocene megafauna is presented by Potter et al. (2026).
- Eren et al. (2026) argue that Pleistocene sites in North America with proboscidean remains associated with Clovis points representing hunting and scavenging events cannot be reliably distinguished on the basis of available evidence, and argue that Clovis foragers likely practiced both hunting and scavenging of large Pleistocene mammals.
- Evidence from the study of assemblages of Pleistocene perishable objects from the Cougar Mountain Cave and Paisley Caves (Oregon, United States), indicative of complexity and sophistication of perishable technologies in the North American Great Basin during the Late Pleistocene, is presented by Rosencrance et al. (2026).
- Carrillo-Briceño et al. (2026) report evidence of exploitation of glyptodonts, ground sloth, proboscideans, macraucheniids and toxodontids by Pleistocene humans from the Taima-Taima site (Venezuela).
- Eren et al. (2026) provide estimates for the first appearance of the atlatl in western North America on the basis of analysis of the archaeological record, and find no evidence supporting atlatl use by foragers from the Clovis culture.
- Pettigrew et al. (2026) report evidence from naturalistic experiments indicating that the atlatl was able to deliver fatal wounds to megafauna, including animals as large as mammoths.
- He et al. (2026) reconstruct the course of peopling of East Asia and subsequent diversification of populations from the studied area during the Paleolithic and Neolithic on the basis of data from Y chromosome genomic data from ancient and modern individuals.
- Zhang et al. (2026) sequence genomes of individuals from the Donghulin site in the North China Plain, and report evidence of population changes over two millennia during the Paleolithic-Neolithic transition.
- A partial humerus with morphological affinities with Late Upper Paleolithic modern humans is described from early Holocene strata from Heilongjiang (China) by Wei et al. (2026).
- Bourgon et al. (2026) report evidence from zinc stable isotope analysis of tooth enamel of humans from the late Pleistocene and Holocene sites from Sri Lanka indicative of a mixed diet including both animal and plant foods, with the plant component of the diet increasing over time (even before the introduction of crop agriculture).
- Watanabe et al. (2026) report evidence from the study of genomes of the Jōmon people indicative of their descent from Upper Paleolithic continental East Asian populations that settled the Japanese archipelago between 27,000 and 19,000 years ago, and evidence of cold adaptation in the Jōmon lineage.
- Evidence from the study of stone tool assemblages from the Buhais Rockshelter (United Arab Emirates) indicative of repeated occupation of the studied area between 210,000 and 16,000 years ago (including in the time of overall increased aridity of the Arabian Peninsula between 60,000 and 16,000 years ago) is presented by Bretzke et al. (2026).
- Evidence from the study of Natufian artefacts and rock art from the Sahout site and the neighbouring sites of Jebel Arnaan and Jebel Misma (Saudi Arabia), indicative of occupation of the studied area by communities interacting with people from the Fertile Crescent during the terminal Pleistocene and early Holocene, is presented by Shipton et al. (2026).
- Davin et al. (2026) report the discovery of clay ornaments from Natufian (late Epipalaeolithic) sites in Israel, interpreted as produced both by adults and by children, and representing the earliest known clay ornamental tradition outside of Europe.
- Evidence of importance of consumption of lizards and snakes in subsistence strategies of Natufian foragers from the El Wad site (Israel) is presented by Lev, Weinstein-Evron & Yeshurun (2026).
- Evidence of intentional pyre cremation at the HOR-1 site (Malawi) approximately 9500 years before present, representing the oldest adult pyre cremation in the world reported to date, is presented by Cerezo-Román et al. (2026).
- Chritz et al. (2026) reconstruct the subsistence of foragers and herders from eastern Africa living from 9500 to 230 years before present on the basis of isotopic values of their tooth enamel and bone collagen, reporting evidence dietary diversity in fisher-foragers and in earliest pastoralists from the Turkana Basin (Kenya), and evidence that specialized pastoralist diets happened approximately 1000 years after the introduction of domestic livestock.
- Martin et al. (2026) reconstruct the human population history in northeastern Africa on the basis of the study of the morphology of bony labyrinths of Late Pleistocene and Holocene individuals, reporting evidence of overall biological discontinuity between foragers and Neolithic food producers in the Middle Nile Valley, but also evidence of limited, localized instances of admixture or continuity between the two groups.
- Surovell et al. (2026) provide new information on the age of the purported pre-Clovis site Monte Verde II (Chile), and argue that the site cannot be older than the middle Holocene.
- Röding et al. (2026) study the morphology of the frontal bone from Hahnöfersand (Germany) described by Bräuer (1980) (initially dated to Late Pleistocene but subsequently considered to be more likely Mesolithic), interpret it as falling within the variability of Holocene Homo sapiens, and find no evidence of a morphology intermediate between those of Neanderthals and modern humans.
- The first molecular evidence of HPV16 in ancient anatomically modern humans is reported from the study of ancient DNA of the Ust'-Ishim man and Ötzi by Yazigi et al. (2026).

== General research ==
- Cerrito, Burkart & van Schaik (2026) review the techniques used to extract information on life history from hominin fossils.
- Towle (2026) reviews longstanding issues in the systematics of hominins, including non-monophyly of at least the genus Australopithecus and mosaic trait distribution among hominin taxa, and proposes to subsume the genera Paranthropus and Australopithecus within the genus Homo.
- Begun (2026) reviews the fossil record of African apes and humans, and argues that the lack of hominin fossils from Africa from the interval between 13.5 and 6–7 million years ago might not simply be the result of incompleteness of the fossil record, and is potentially consistent with the origin of hominins in Eurasia and their dispersal into Africa after 7 million years ago.
- D'Oliveira Coelho et al. (2026) review changes of estimates of timing of divergence of bonobo-chimpanzee and hominin lineages in studies from preceding years, and consider it most likely that this split happened in the late Miocene.
- Gardner et al. (2026) study changes of body size throughout the evolutionary history of hominins, and interpret their finding as consistent with marked body mass increase in members of the genus Homo other than Homo habilis and Homo rudolfensis.
- A study on the morphological diversity of the femur and the humerus in extant hominids is published by Aramendi (2026), who interprets her findings as indicative of variable utility of different long bones for taxonomic identification of hominin fossils, and as indicating that some of the variability observed in isolated or fragmentary hominin fossils might not be caused by presence of more than one taxon in the studied fossil material.
- Evidence indicating that proximity in principal component analysis in the studies of morphological variation is not necessarily indicative of close phylogenetic affinities of fossil hominins is presented by Raskin et al. (2026).
- Evidence indicating that hominins repeatedly inhabited areas of Africa with climate suitable for both cutaneous and visceral leishmaniasis during their evolutionary history is presented by Trájer (2026).
- Review of evidence of links between hominin biological evolution and Early and Middle Stone Age culture is published by Key (2026).
- Evidence from the study of ethnohistorical and ethnographic records of modern endurance pursuit hunters, indicating that optimization of subsistence efficiency and signaling of hunting prowess were likely the primary selective pressures in the evolution of a running gait of early hominins, is presented by Winterhalder & Morin (2026).
- Joordens & Schagatay (2026) argue that exceptional stamina and aerobic endurance of humans compared to other apes might be a result of underwater foraging and changes in cardiorespiratory physiology related to development of endurance breath-hold diving by coastal hominin populations.
- Hunter et al. (2026) compare the carpal morphology of apes (including fossil hominins and modern humans), providing evidence of hominins and extant African apes sharing morphological features of carpal morphology that are likely linked to knuckle walking, and argue that human wrist evolved from an African ape-like wrist.
- Two clavicles interpreted as belonging to Early Pleistocene hominins capable of apelike arboreality are described from the Swartkrans Member 1 (South Africa) by Pickering et al. (2026).
- Carlson et al. (2026) determine relative limb strength in Australopithecus and early members of the genus Homo, interpreted as indicative of frequent arboreal behavior in Australopithecus, as well as indicative of departure of hominins from arboreality by ∼1.8 million years ago.
- Evidence from the study of extant Japanese macaques, indicating that the initial shift from quadrupedalism to bipedalism in the hominin evolution might have involved a shift of the primary action of the gluteus medius without any required morphological change, is presented by Shitara et al. (2026).
- Kurki & Wall-Scheffler (2026) study the variation of pelvic canal dimensions in extant humans and extinct hominins, finding no evidence of a single trajectory of evolution of hominin pelvic shape.
- Sekhavati, Prang & Strait (2026) study the relationships between hominin foot morphology and environmental context throughout the evolutionary history of hominins, and link the emergence of hominin bipedalism to increases of aridity in Central and Eastern Africa.
- Komza, Viola & Schroeder (2026) interpret the evolution of the morphology of hominin midfoot as affected by selection for bipedalism in the lateral side in early bipeds such as Ardipithecus ramidus and shaped by a broad range of evolutionary processes in later hominins.
- Evidence from the study of the organization of mineral nanocrystals in teeth of extant and extinct hominins and other primates, indicating that enamel nanocrystal misorientation in hominin teeth changed in conjunction with dietary shifts of members of the human lineage (including the introduction of meat and agricultural products into their diet), is presented by Gilbert et al. (2026).
- Amano et al. (2026) provide evidence of morphological differences between brains of Australopithecus and early Homo.
- Zhou et al. (2026) reconstruct hydroclimate variability in Arabia throughout the last 500,000 years, and link hominin dispersals into and occupation of Arabia during the Middle and Late Pleistocene to both wetter climatic conditions during Green Arabia periods and to brief phases of high-intensity rainfall during drier periods.
- Balzeau et al. (2026) provide a direct comparison between brain and endocast characteristics in the same individuals on the basis of data from the study of 75 volunteers, reporting the discovery of endocranial marks unrelated to cerebral sulci, and propose a new standardised approach to the study of fossil endocasts and reconstruction of brains of fossil hominins.
- Review of virtual anatomy methods used in paleoanthropological studies is published by Aramendi & de Jager (2026).
- A new method for reconstruction of missing landmarks in the studies of hominin long bones is presented by Courtenay & Aramendi (2026).
- Keevil et al. (2026) provide measurement data from bone surface modifications resulting from simulated stone tool and percussive butchery, carnivore feeding trials and ungulate trampling, facilitating identification of bone modifications in the studies on the origin and evolution of human carnivory.
- Hobaiter & Dominy (2026) argue that the emergence of spoken language and the replacement of ape-like gestural systems by speech as the default mode of human communication might have resulted from fireside storytelling.
