= Isturits =

Isturits Izturitze
- Commune
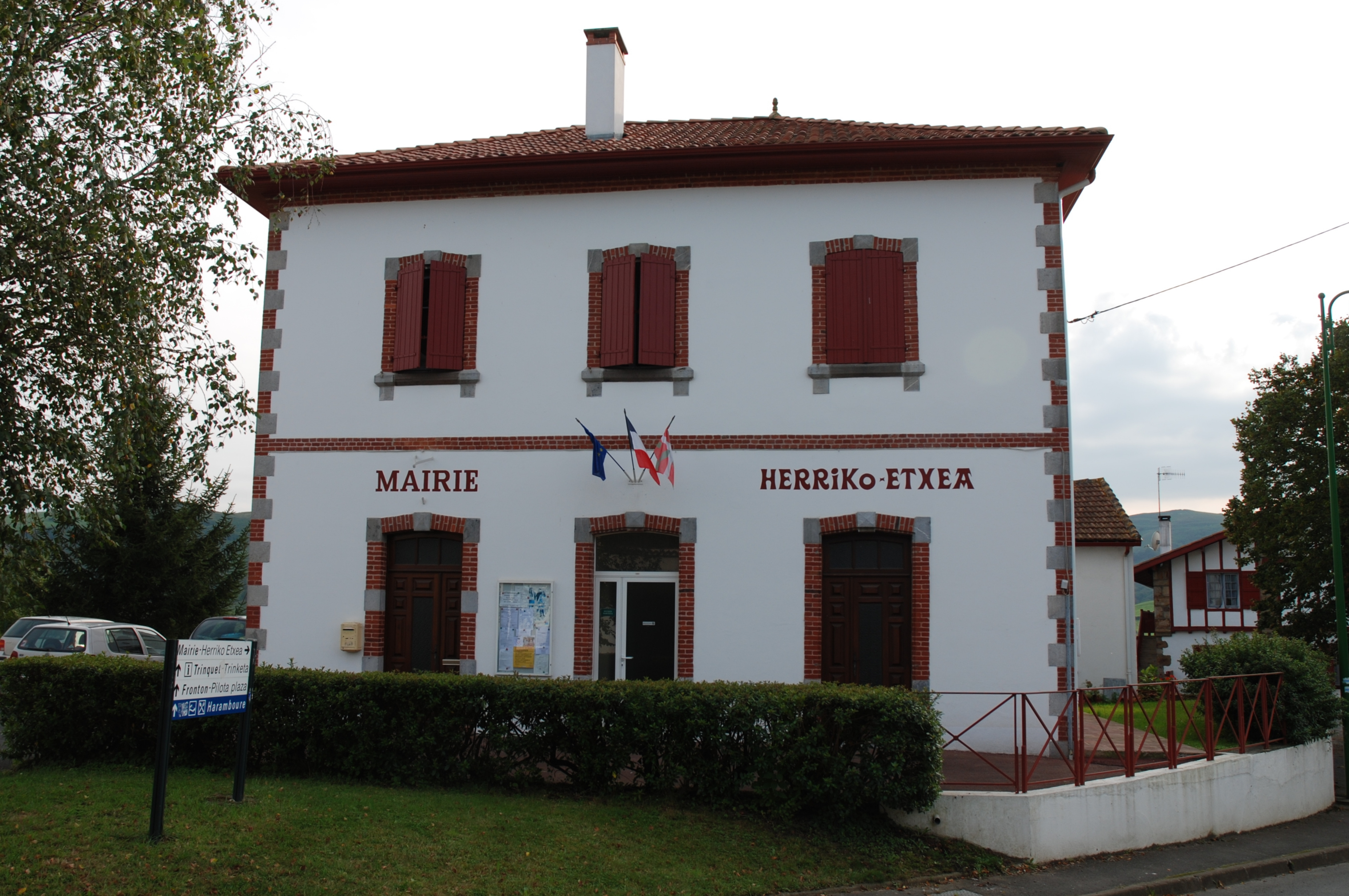
- The town hall of Isturits

- Coat of arms
- Location of Isturits
- Location within France Location within Nouvelle-Aquitaine
- Coordinates: 43°22′01″N 1°12′14″W
- Country: France
- Region: Nouvelle-Aquitaine
- Department: Pyrénées-Atlantiques
- Arrondissement: Bayonne
- Canton: Pays de Bidache, Amikuze et Ostibarre
- Intercommunality: CA Pays Basque

Government
  - Mayor (2020–2026): Frédéric Camou
- Area^{1}: 13.60 km^{2} (5.25 sq mi)
- Elevation: 125 m (410 ft)
- Highest elevation: 345 m (1,132 ft)
- Lowest elevation: 58 m (190 ft)
- Population (2023): 537
  - Density: 39.5/km^{2} (102/sq mi)
- Time zone: UTC+01:00 (CET)
  - Summer (DST): UTC+02:00 (CEST)
- INSEE/Postal code: 64277 /64240
- ^{1} French Land Register data, which excludes lakes, ponds, glaciers > 1 km^{2} (0.386 sq mi or 247 acres) and river estuaries.

Isturits (French pronunciation: [istyʁits]; Occitan: Istorics; Basque: Izturitze; also Isturitz) is a commune in the Pyrénées-Atlantiques department in south-western France. It is located in the former province of Lower Navarre (Arberoa).

The Isturitz and Oxocelhaya caves are an important Paleolithic site where a Neanderthal mandible was found, as well as later modern human finds associated with the Aurignacian, Solutrean and Magdalenian. They also include cave paintings and bone flutes.

== See also ==
- Communes of the Pyrénées-Atlantiques department
