= Abric Romaní =

Archaeological site in Catalonia, Spain

Abric Romaní, also known as Abric Romaní de Capellades, is an archaeological site with unique and important finds pertaining to Neanderthals. As wooden materials have been preserved, the site provides insight into Neanderthal wood processing, which is unique. The site is located 60 meters above the current level of the Noya river, at an elevation of 300–320 m a.s.l. The site is situated in the municipality of Capellades, approximately 50 km from Barcelona. The first archaeological artifacts were discovered in 1909 by Amador Romaní, the site was later named after him (it was previously called Balma del Fossar Vell). The site is primarily dated to the Late Middle Paleolithic, from 70,000 to 39,000 years before present (BP), when Neanderthals inhabited the site. The presence of an Aurignacian industry in the youngest layer, dated to around 39,000 years B.C., indicates that modern humans arrived at the site at that time.

== Description ==
Abric Romaní has a 17-meter thick layer of travertine lying beneath the cliffs known as Cingles d'El Capelló in Catalan, formed by ancient terraces and travertine springs (tuff pits) that cross the coastal mountain range near the town of Capellades. The site is a rock overhang located on a steep slope. As of 2011, 27 layers were known in a series of archaeological finds from various periods. All levels originate from the Middle Paleolithic, except for layer A, which belongs to the Upper Paleolithic. The oldest layers have an estimated age of around 56,000 years. No prehistoric human remains have been found at the site. The fossilization of wooden tools makes the site one of the most important concerning Neanderthals. The area also has significant geological value. Geologically, the mountain is formed of travertine, a type of sedimentary limestone that forms when calcium precipitates from warm calcium-rich water.

== History ==
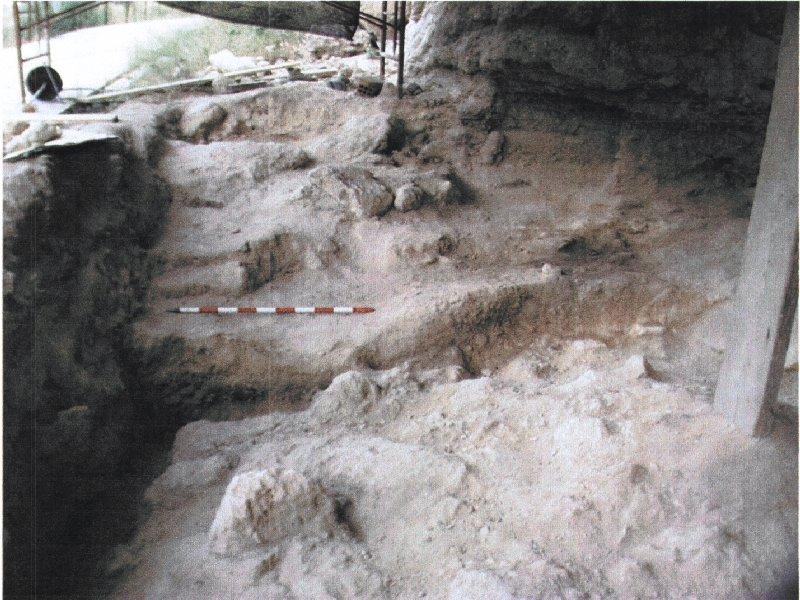
View from above the nearby Abric Agut site, with archaeological excavation areas

The site was exploited as a quarry during the 1300s and 1400s. During the 1800s, the site was used as a burial ground, under the name Balma del Fossar Vell. Abric Romaní was discovered in 1909 by archaeologist Amador Romaní Guerra. He began excavations there the same year and moved the recent human remains to the Capellades cemetery. Before the Spanish Civil War, excavations were conducted by the Catalan Institute of Studies under the leadership of Norbert Font i Sagué and Lluís Maria Vidal. Beginning in the 1950s, Eduard Ripoll and Henry de Lumley dedicated 15 years to studies at the site. Since 1989, this task has been taken over by the Department of Prehistory at the University of Rovira i Virgili in Tarragona.

== Geology ==
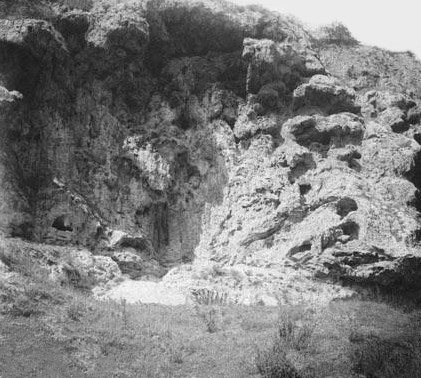
The rock shelter seen from the front, the remains of the tuff dome are visible at the top

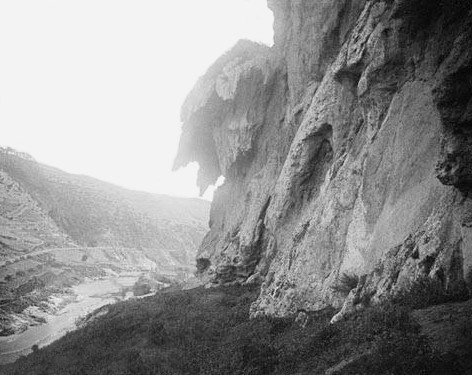
Abric Romaní, remains of fossil tuff

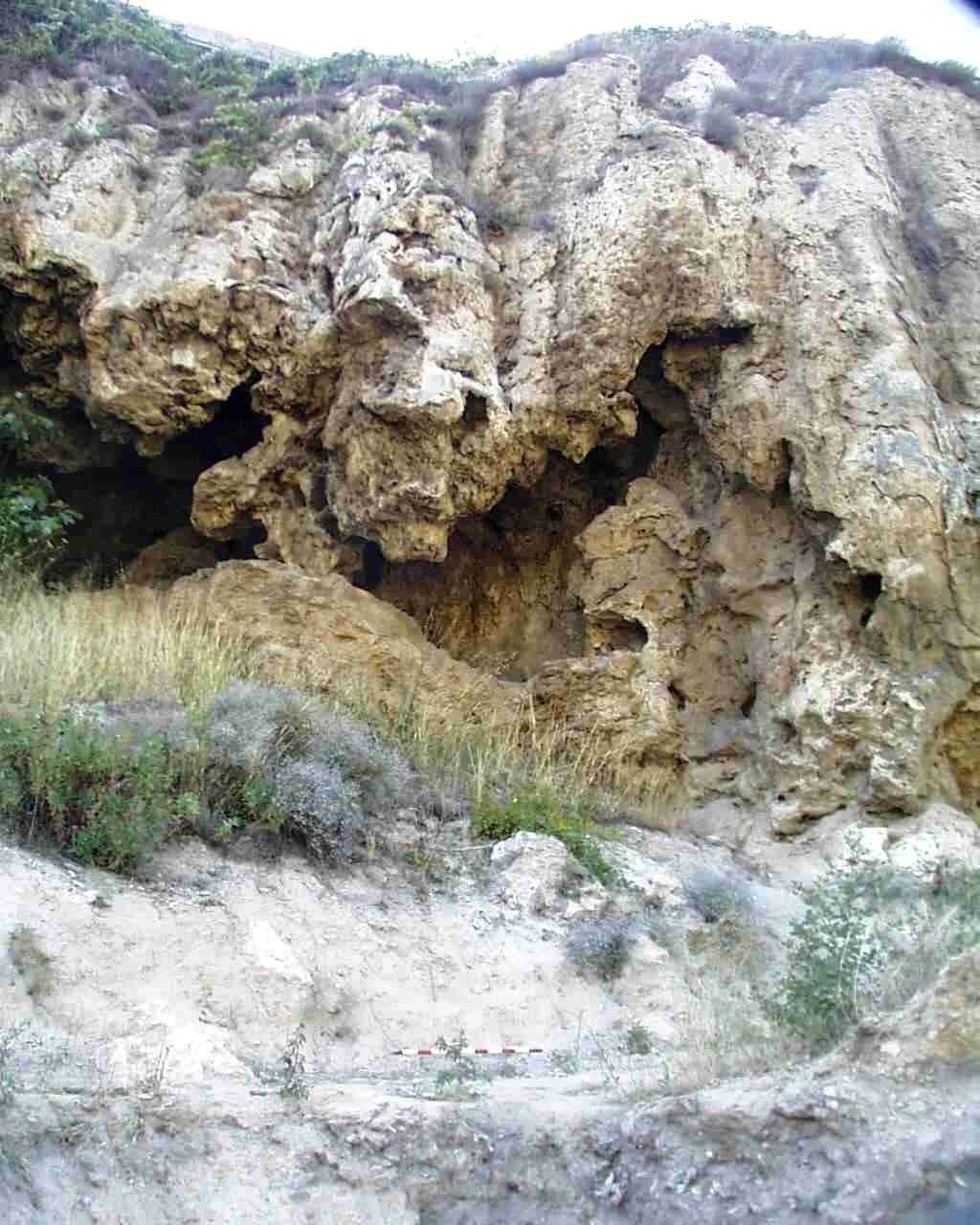
The nearby archaeological site Balma dels Pinyons, under the same cliff

The dome-shaped roof of the rock shelter is an ancient fossilized tuff formed at the Cingles d'El Capelló. Abric Romaní itself forms a cavity that appears to be an old outflow of water that is very rich in calcium carbonate, which allowed the formation of travertines. Geologically, five phases have been recorded at the site. From the most recent (Phase I) to the oldest (Phase V). The site has been significantly eroded, and the dome has largely collapsed. Radiocarbon and uranium-thorium dating of sedimentary fills and archaeological remains have provided a chronological range from 70,000 to 39,000 years BP.

- Phase I: the final fill consisted mainly of a slow sedimentation phase primarily composed of fragments of stalagmites and loess.
- Phase II: was a drainage phase that formed domes of travertine.
- Phase III: the basal deposit is formed of gravitational sediments at the waterline. This phase corresponds to archaeological levels I and H.
- Phase IV: is dominated by falling large boulders.
- Phase V: deposits formed by falling boulders alternating with episodes of sedimentation in water.

== Paleoclimate ==
Pollen analyses conducted by F. Burjachs-Julià have made it possible to identify several climate periods with different plant species as quality indicators to determine the paleoecological development at the site. The site has five paleoclimatic phases.

- From 70,200 to 65,500 years BP: the warmest phase of the settlement, tree pollen accounts for 88% of the total pollen count. The most important of the thermophilic plant species is oak and the Oleaceae genus Phillyrea.
- From 65,000 to 56,800 years BP: cooling characterized by forests of pines, which reach 72%, juniper, sage (genus Artemisia), and grasses, which characterize the entire sequence.
- From 56,800 to 49,500 years BP: alternating warm and cold phases. As in the previous sequence, there is wormwood, grass, and pine. However, the presence of thermophilic plants suggests that warmer periods occurred during this cold phase.
- From 49,500 to 46,200 years BP: cold and dry climate with the lowest levels of tree pollen as well as the presence of Asteraceae and grasses.
- From 46,200 to 40,800 years BP: warming characterized by the spread of pine and juniper, along with an increase in oak and Oleaceae.

== Finds of wood casts ==
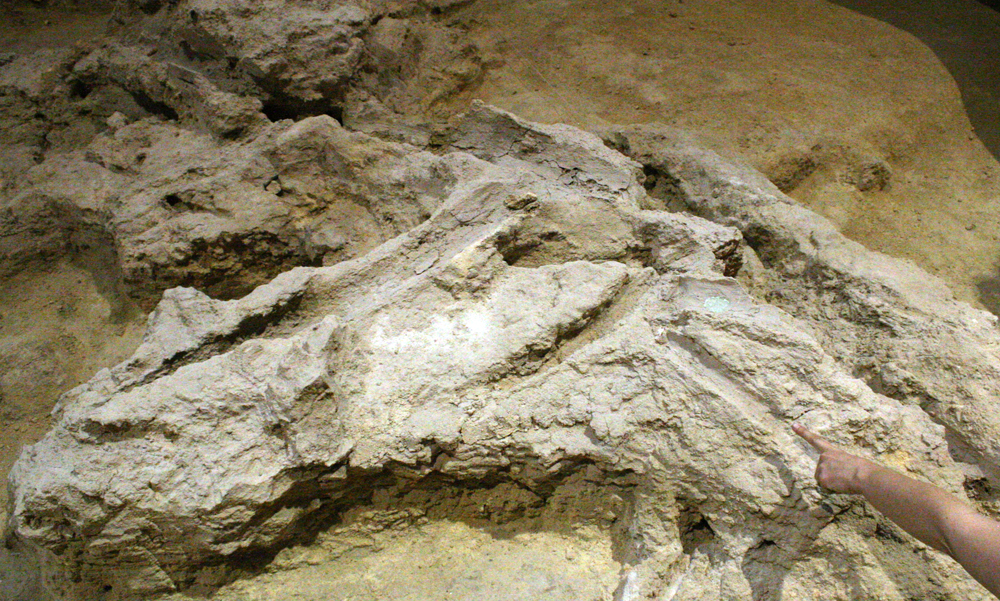
Natural travertine casts of wood from the Middle Paleolithic

At Abric Romaní, remnants of wood have been covered by a flood of debris and clay and very calcium-rich water. The water, which was highly enriched with calcium carbonate, led to the formation of a layer of travertine, resulting in the preservation of the wood or impressions of the wood in the limestone. The find circumstances are unique in the world.

Most of the wooden remains found at the site consist of rounded wooden sticks (remains of tree trunks) and small wooden sticks (diameter up to 2–3 cm), which correspond to branches or larger sticks. All the remains of wood found so far have been dated to the Middle Paleolithic period, with the oldest samples dating back to 70,000 years ago. Excavations at the site have also revealed a series of tools made from wood.

== Tool production ==
Over 5000 pieces of flint have been documented from Abric Romaní. The oldest stone tools discovered in layer G have been dated to approximately 56,000 years ago. The tools are attributed to Neanderthals and their typical production methods are related to the Mousterian culture. They are primarily characterized by the production of tools, including flakes, blades, and a variety of retouched tools. Besides typical Mousterian tools, flake tools have been documented from the site, such as the production of simple, unretouched cores. Among the most remarkable finds is the combination of Levallois techniques and tool production. The tools have been classified as mainly hunting tools, while there are also a significant number of tools used for processing wood.
