= Thomas Quarry I =

Archaeological site in Morocco

- Comparison of North African hominin mandibles; specimen ThI-GH-10717 from Thomas Quarry I is at upper right

- Location in Morocco
- 33.568°N 7.696°W
- Type: Archaeological and paleoanthropological site
- Periods: Early Pleistocene–Middle Pleistocene
- Cultures: Acheulean
- Location: Casablanca, Morocco

Thomas Quarry I is a Paleolithic archaeological and paleoanthropological site on the southwestern outskirts of Casablanca, Morocco. The quarry contains several prehistoric deposits, including an archaeological layer known as Unit L and a cave called the Grotte à Hominidés ("Hominid Cave"). The site has produced Acheulean stone tools, fossil fauna and hominin remains spanning important stages of the Pleistocene. Stone tools from Unit L provide evidence of Acheulean occupation in the Casablanca region around 1.3 million years ago. In 2026, hominin fossils from the Grotte à Hominidés were securely dated to approximately 773,000 years ago. The fossils display a combination of primitive traits and features later found in Homo sapiens and Eurasian archaic humans, and have been interpreted as evidence for an African population near the ancestry of modern humans.

== Research history ==
Thomas Quarry I became an important paleoanthropological locality following the discovery of a partial hominin mandible in the Grotte à Hominidés in 1969. Further investigations identified a Lower Acheulean assemblage in deposits beneath the cave in 1985, and controlled archaeological excavations were subsequently carried out as part of a long-running Franco-Moroccan research programme on the prehistory of Casablanca.

Excavations in the cave recovered additional hominin teeth, stone artefacts and a large assemblage of fossil mammals. Research at Thomas Quarry I and nearby Casablanca sites has continued for several decades as part of the Franco-Moroccan Préhistoire de Casablanca programme.

== Archaeology and dating ==
Unit L contains one of the oldest known Acheulean assemblages in northwestern Africa. Archaeological evidence from the unit includes stone artefacts associated with Pleistocene fauna, and dating work has placed the earliest Acheulean occupation of Thomas Quarry I at approximately 1.3 million years ago.

The chronology of the Grotte à Hominidés was debated for many years. Earlier dating methods had suggested ages of roughly 400,000 to 500,000 years for some of the fossil-bearing deposits. A 2026 study established a substantially older age using high-resolution magnetostratigraphy. Sediments containing the hominin fossils record the Brunhes–Matuyama reversal, allowing the assemblage to be dated to approximately 773,000 ± 4,000 years ago.

== Hominin remains ==
Hominin remains recovered from the Grotte à Hominidés include several mandibles, isolated teeth, vertebrae and a femur. Some of the remains were excavated during campaigns in the 1990s and 2000s, while others had been discovered earlier in the site's history.

A hominin femur from the cave bears numerous tooth marks made by a large carnivore, probably a hyena. The specimen has been interpreted as evidence that hominins at the site were consumed by carnivores, either through predation or scavenging.

The hominins described in 2026 have a mosaic of archaic and more derived anatomical features. The researchers considered them likely to represent an evolved African form of Homo erectus sensu lato rather than assigning them to a newly named species.

== Significance for human evolution ==
The 773,000-year-old fossils occupy a period close to genetic estimates for the divergence of the lineage leading to Homo sapiens from the lineage leading to Neanderthals and Denisovans. Well-dated African hominin fossils from this period are rare, making the Thomas Quarry I assemblage important for understanding the ancestry of later Middle Pleistocene humans.

The fossils are approximately contemporary with Homo antecessor from Atapuerca, Spain, but differ anatomically from those remains. The study's authors argued that the Thomas Quarry population provides strong evidence for an African lineage near the base of the ancestry of H. sapiens. Independent reporting described the discovery as helping to fill a major gap in the African hominin record between roughly one million and 600,000 years ago.

== See also ==
- Jebel Irhoud
- Prehistory of Morocco
- Human evolution
- Acheulean
- Homo antecessor
