= Isturitz and Oxocelhaya caves =

Coordinates: 43°21′10″N 1°12′22″W

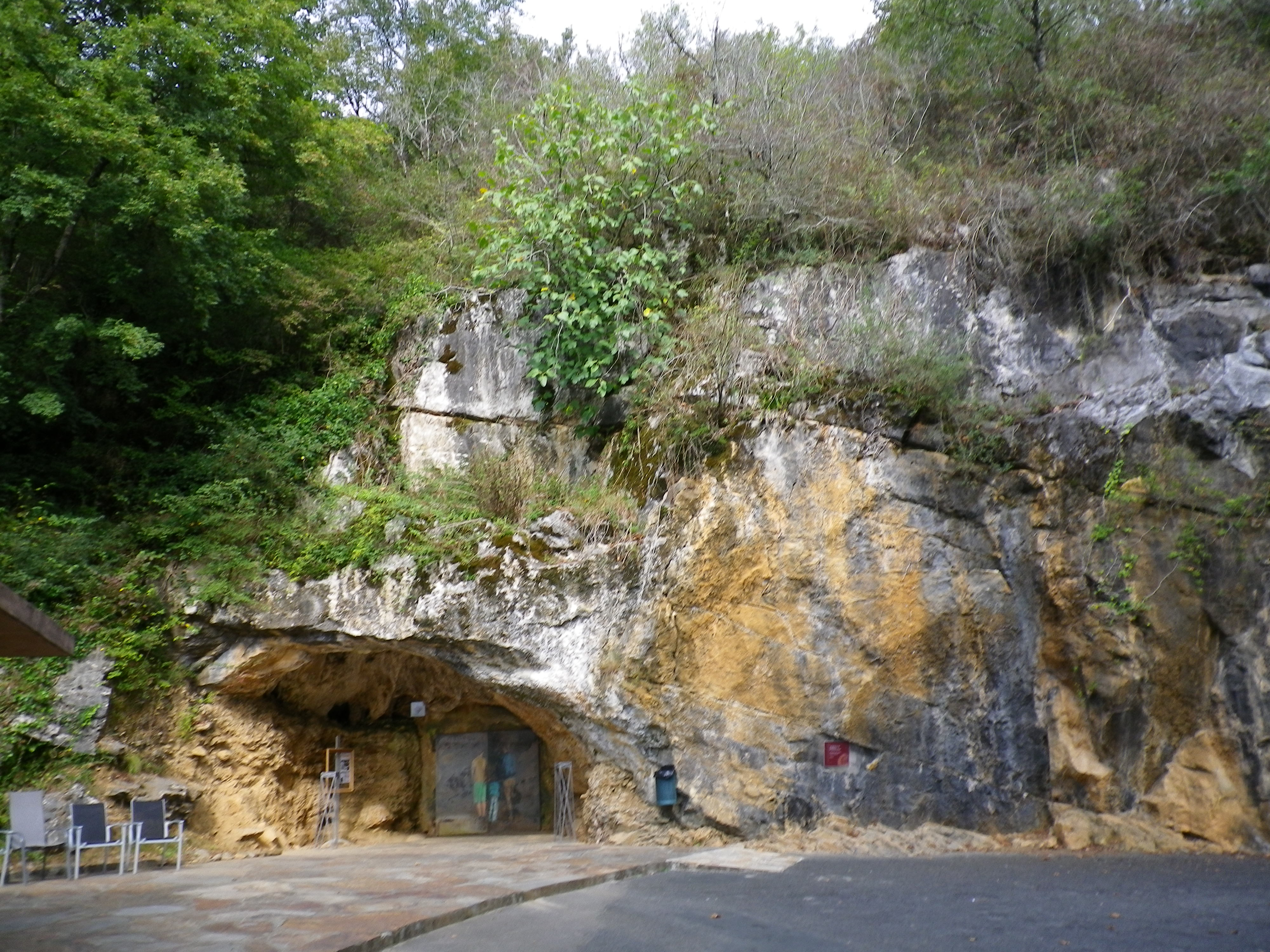
- Entrance of the Isturitz Cave

- Location within Aquitaine
- Location: Lower Navarre, Pyrénées-Atlantiques
- Discovery: 1929

The Isturitz and Oxocelhaya caves (French: Grottes d'Isturitz et d'Oxocelhaya) are an important Paleolithic site where a Neanderthal mandible was found, as well as later modern human finds associated with the Aurignacian, Solutrean and Magdalenian. They also include cave paintings and bone flutes. The caves are located in the Gaztelu hill in the Arberoue Valley in the foothills of Pyrenees, in Lower Navarre, a traditional region of the department of Pyrénées-Atlantiques, southwestern France, part of the French Basque Country.

The French government has classified the site as a Monument historique since 1953. Occupation by Neanderthal and Homo sapiens communities extends over a period from 80,000–10,000 years BP, and continued to be use (perhaps only for burials) until the Roman era. The site is discussed within the context of Franco-Cantabrian prehistory, as among the easternmost decorated caves that extended along the Pyrenees and Cantabrian Mountains.

== Topography ==
Gaztelu hill, cut away to show the three caves.

The caves are within the territories of the communes of Isturits et de Saint-Martin-d'Arberoue, in the vicinity of Hasparren. They form part of a system of three caves carved into the limestone Gaztelu hill in succession by the Arbéroue stream, which flows into the Lihoury, a tributary of the Bidouze. The hill itself is surmounted by the Rocafort castle.

- Isturitz Cave: the high cave in the hill, with openings on both sides of the hill.
- Oxocelhaya Cave: 20 meters below Isturitz, notable for its calcite concretions.
- Erberua Cave: where the Arbéroue stream runs today, with a siphon at each end; not explored until 1973.

== Isturitz cave ==
The Isturitz cave is divided into two parts: the Hall of Saint-Martin (or South Hall) and the Main Hall or Hall of Isturitz (or North Hall). At the beginning of the Mesolithic, the opening that faces the town of Saint-Martin-d'Arberoue is estimated to have been 15 and 20 m wide and about 10 m high, making it visible to humans a distance.

== Human remains ==
The most common human remains from Isturitz are cranial vaults, which have been cut-marked and modified to create drinking cups ("coupelles"), dating from the Magdalenian (~15 to 12,000 years BP).

== Gallery ==
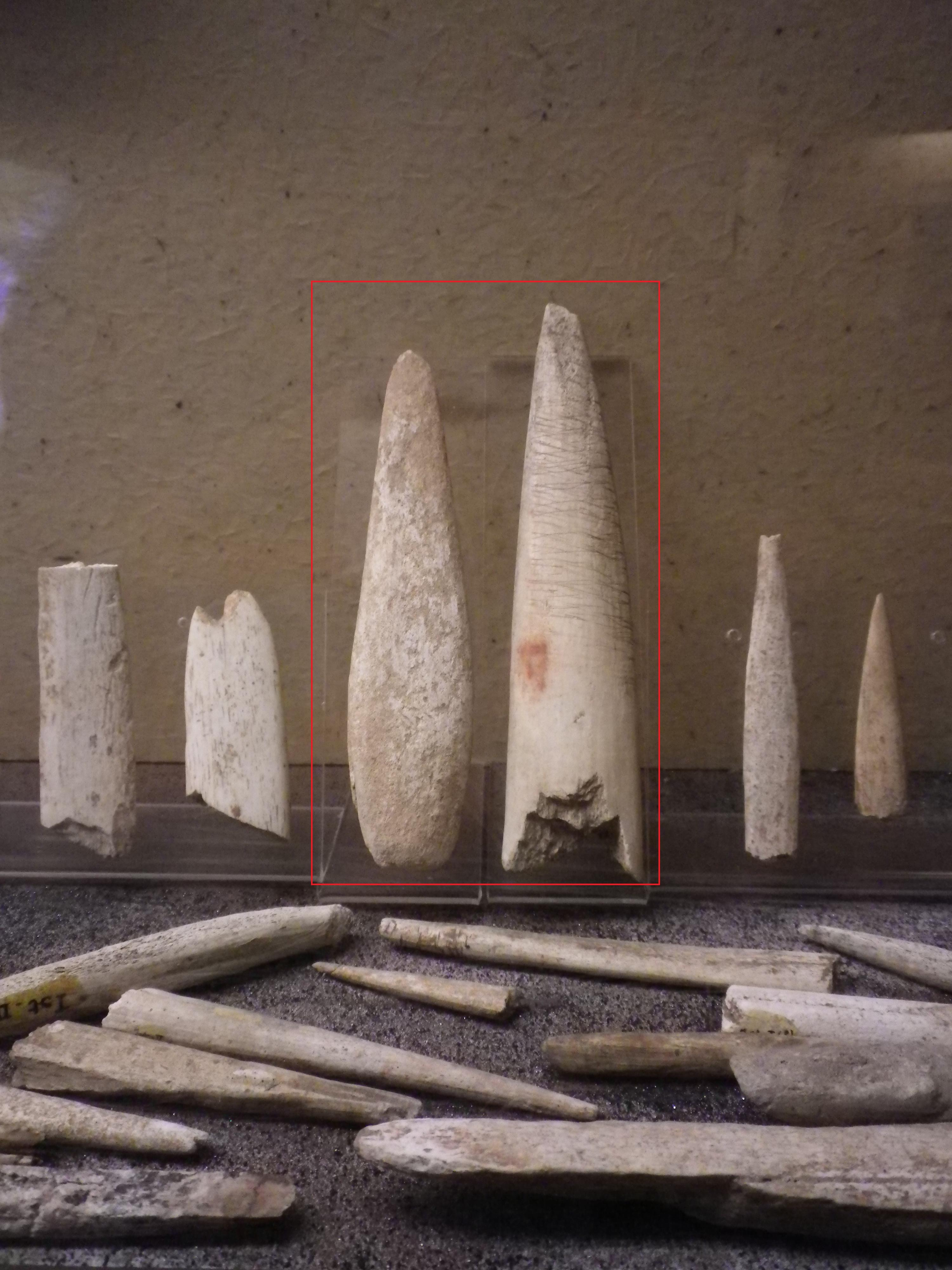
Among Gravettian projectile points; a red box surrounds the two from Isturitz.

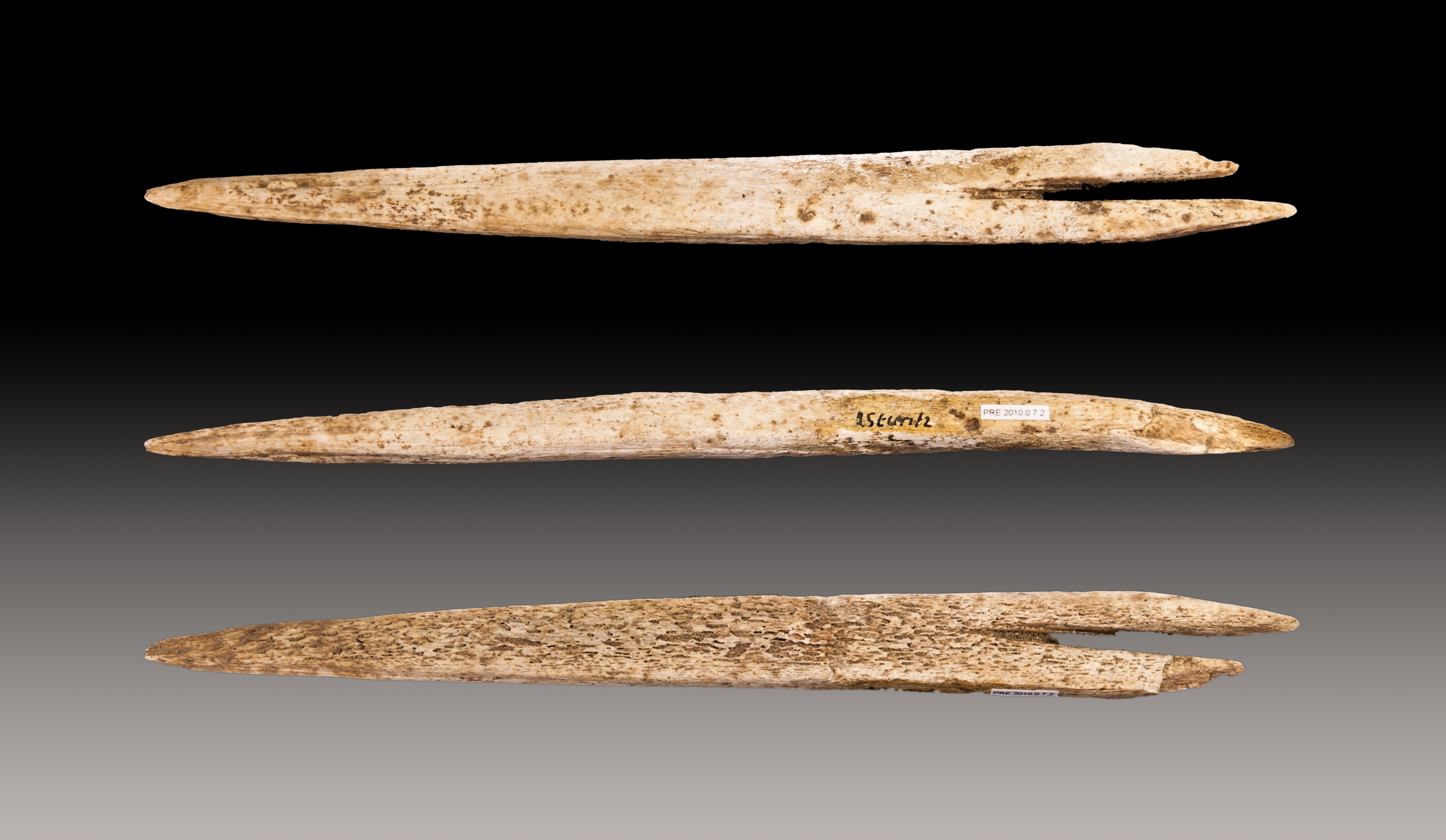
Assegai points

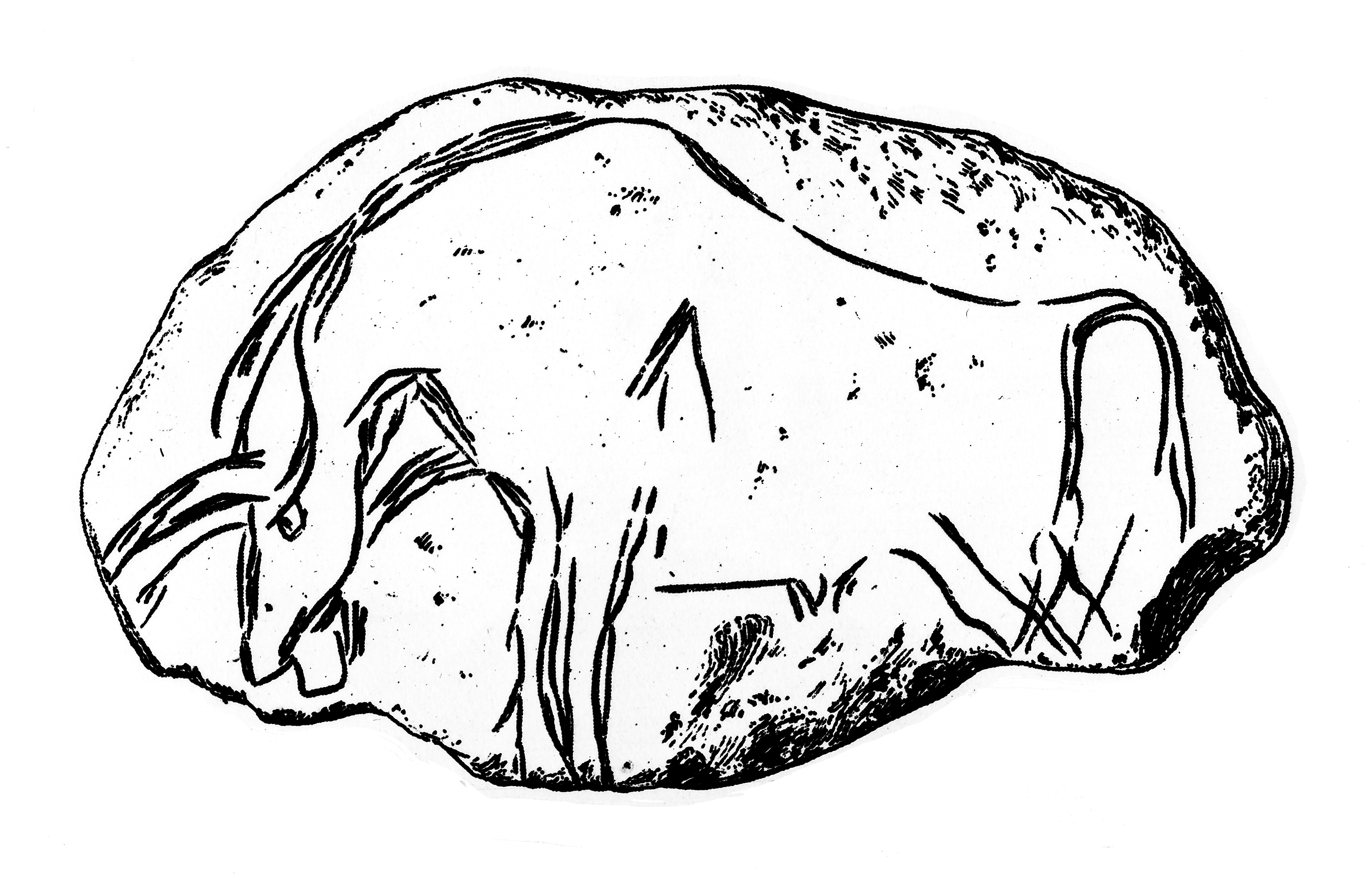
Engraving on stone found in a cave at Isturitz showing wounded ox with weapon in its side. Wellcome Images

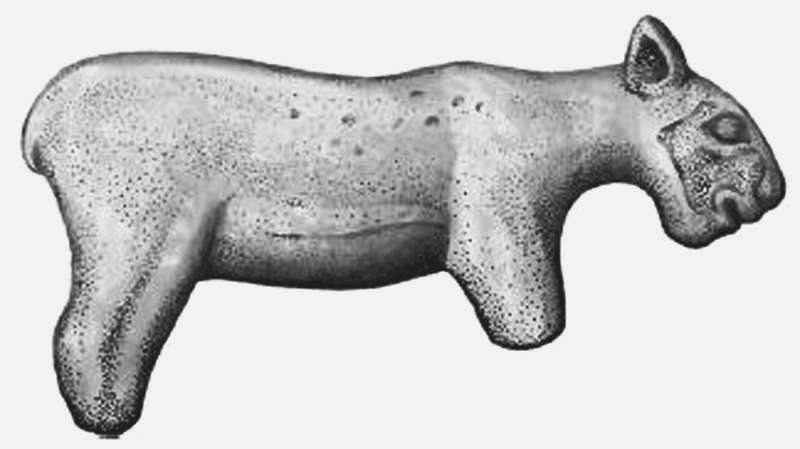
Statuette from Isturitz found in 1896 but later lost. This is the drawing of the drawing of the photo of statuette. It represents probably cave lion cub or less probably Homotherium latidens. Statuette was made in Late Pleistocene.

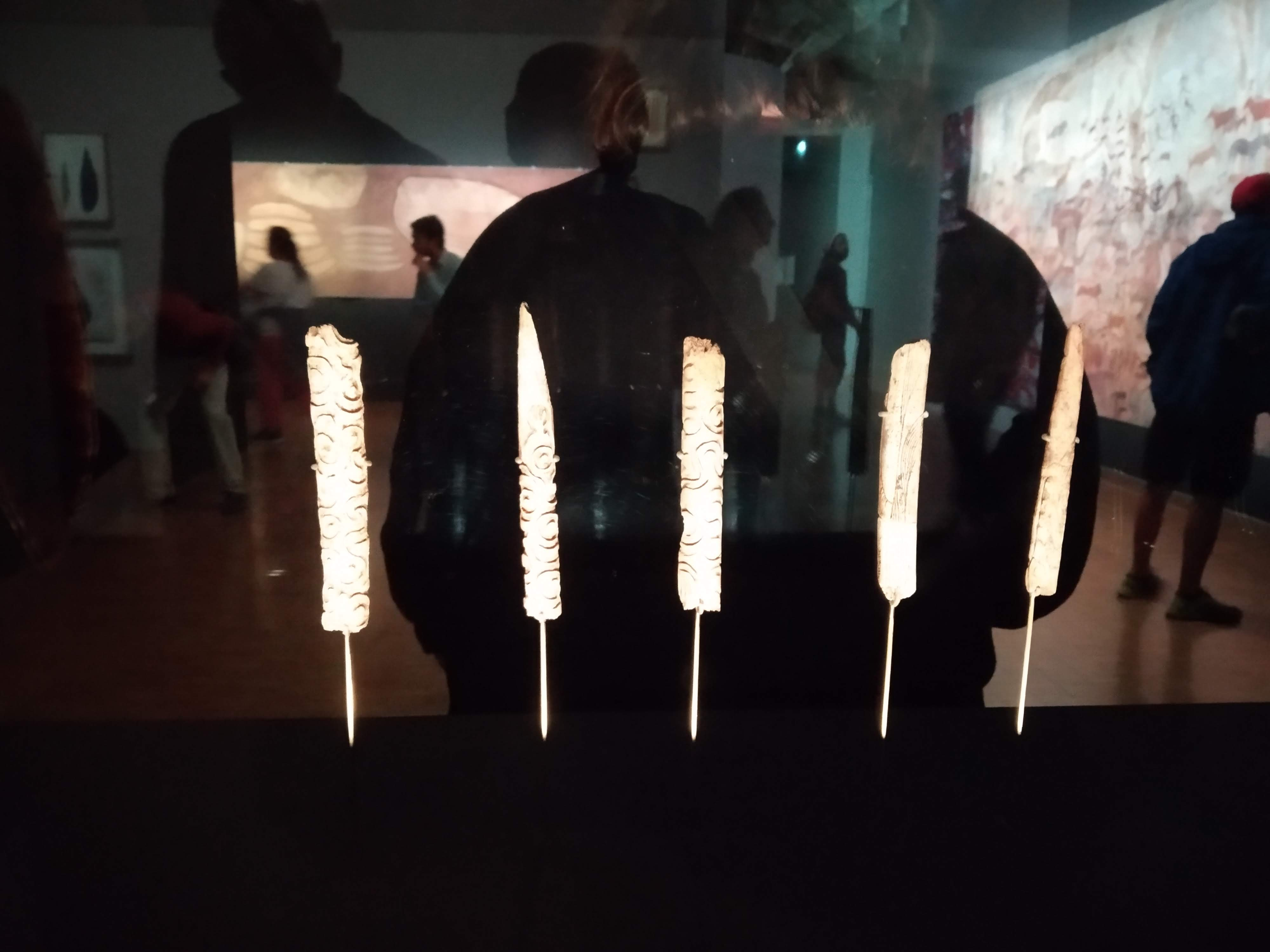
Baguettes demi-rondes (spear tips or points) engraved in spirals

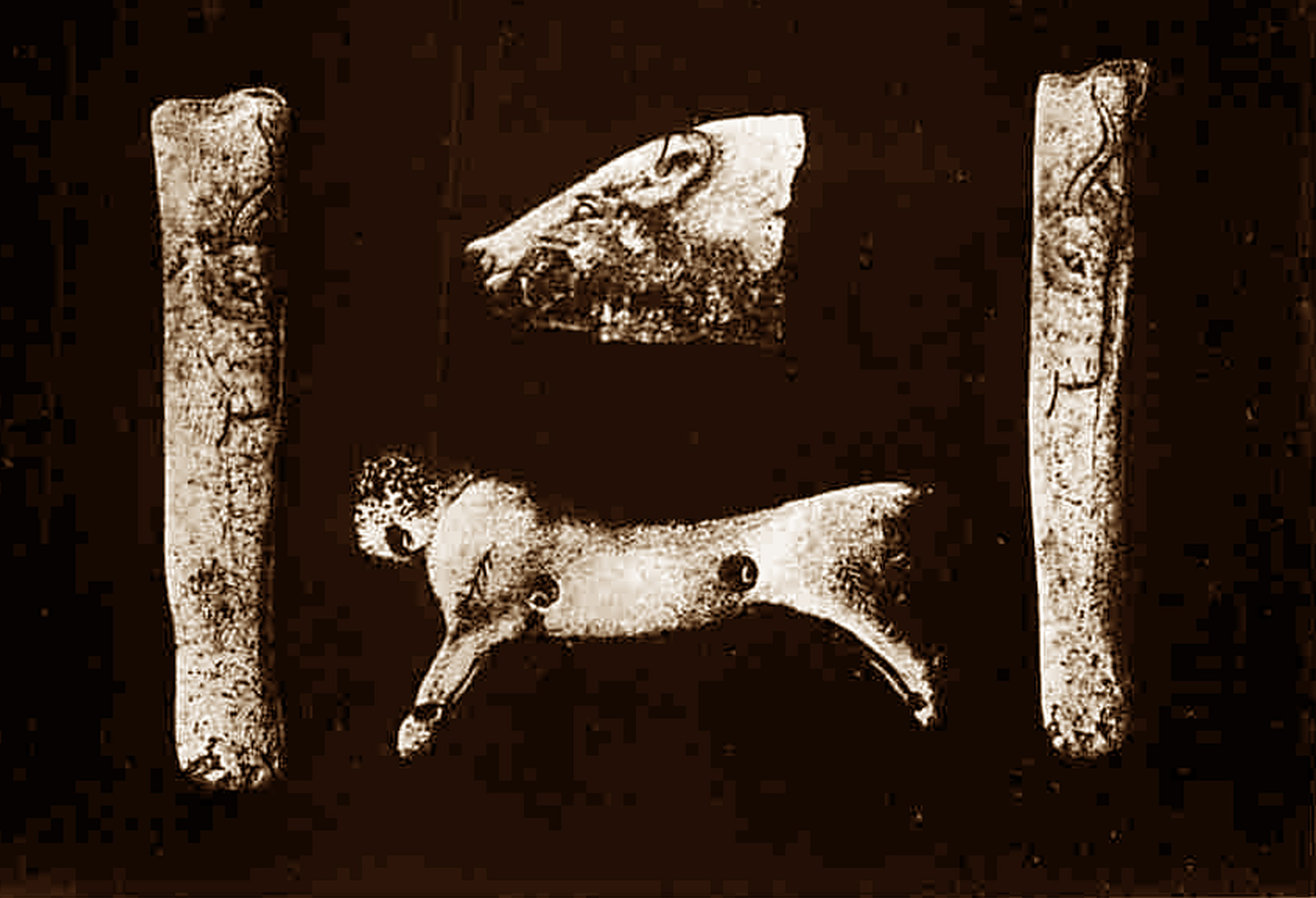
Feline with heads of a bear and bison

== Source ==
This article incorporates material from the corresponding article in French wikipedia.
