= Liang Metanduno =

Cave and archaeological site in Indonesia

Coordinates: 4.8985°S 122.6595°E

- Interactive map of Liang Metanduno
- Location: Muna Island, Sulawesi, Indonesia
- Length: 23 m
- Height variation: 8 m
- Discovery: 1984
- Geology: Karst
- Entrances: 1

Liang Metanduno is a cave and archaeological site on Muna Island, Southeast Sulawesi, Indonesia. Several rock paintings within the cave have been suggested to be around 71,000 years old, which would make them the world's oldest known rock art, but there is skepticism about the validity of these dates.

== Background ==
Muna Island was explored by the Pusat Penelitian Purbakala dan Peninggalan Nasional (National Prehistoric and Heritage Research Center, later renamed National Archaeology Research Institute or NARC) of the Indonesian government, which discovered the area as a site of prehistoric cave rock arts in 1977. The cave arts consisted of an array of human, animal and Sun depictions. Liang Metanduno was one of the easily accessible caves. Liang is an Indonesian for "cave", and metanduno is a Muna language for "to gore". The NARC organised a second exploration in 1984 by which additional rock arts and new caves containing were discovered.

Liang Metanduno has a single entrance with a dome shape measuring 21 metres (69 ft) wide. It is 23 metres (75 ft) long from mouth to the wall end, 23 metres (75 ft) wide in average, and 8 metres (26 ft) high. It is of karst (carbonate rocks including limestone) formation. Stalactites and stalagmites are actively formed. It has become one of the main tourist attraction in Muna Island, and stairs are constructed at the entrance for ease of entering.

== Rock arts ==
S.A. Kosasih, the leader of the 1984 exploration, documented 316 rock arts in Liang Metanduno. Most of the pictures are within the well-lit area of the cave opening. Most of the drawings are well preserved while some are vandalised or worn out or covered by green moss. Hand stencils were discovered by Adhi Agus Oktaviana during the 2015 exploration.

=== Paintings ===
The pictures are those of human figures, centipedes, chickens, deer, dogs, horses, pigs, snakes, boats, suns, and some unidentifiable objects. There were drawn using ochre pigments for red and brown colours, and charcoal for black. The picture fills and lines were made with brushes.

=== Hand stencils ===
Seven negative hand stencils have been identified. The images were created by spraying hands with pigment against the wall. They show normal hand figures kept spread, except one which shows a pointed finger. The age of the hand imprints was estimated using uranium-thorium dating. The findings reported in Nature in 2026 suggested that two of the stencils were the world's oldest known rock art, with an age of around 71,000 (minimum estimate 67,800) years. They are older than those of the Iberian Mediterranean Basin, which had been previously estimated based on uranium-thorium dating at 64,800 years old. However, there is skepticism about the validity of these dates, because these uranium dates are based on the assumption that no leaching of the uranium had occurred. If any leaching had occurred then this would skew the uranium to thorium ratio to make the estimated age artificially older than reality. Examination of other rock art suggests that this can result in the estimated age of the rock art being tens of thousands of years older than given by other methods such as radiocarbon dating the pigment which are likely to be more reliable. Such leaching is difficult to detect or rule out in the absence of other dating methods.
