= Perdicaris =

Perdicaris may refer to:

- Gregory Anthony Perdicaris (1810–1883), a Greek American statesman, lawyer, professor, author, and entrepreneur, father of Ion Hanford Perdicaris
- Ion Hanford Perdicaris (1840–1925), an American author, professor, lawyer, painter, and playwright, also known as a humanitarian and human rights activist, son of Gregory Anthony Perdicaris
  - Perdicaris affair, also known as the Perdicaris incident, the kidnapping of Ion Hanford Perdicaris and his stepson, in 1904 in Tangier, Morocco
  - Perdicaris Park and Perdicaris Villa, in Tangier, Morocco, named after Ion Hanford Perdicaris
