= Trenton Academy =

Defunct school in Trenton, New Jersey

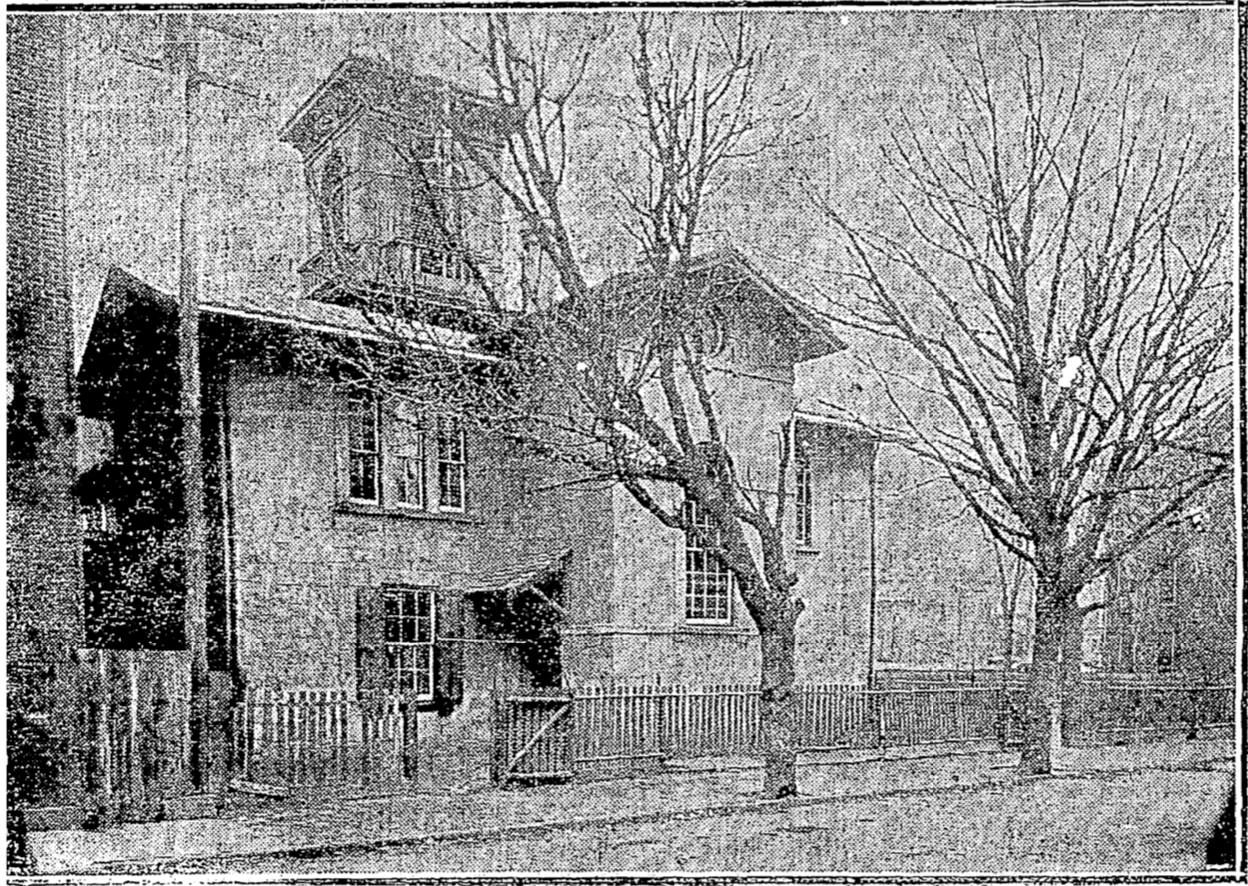
The Trenton Academy

Trenton Academy was a private school in the city of Trenton, New Jersey, from 1781 to 1884 that served children ages 4–16. It was located on Academy Street where the Trenton Public Library is presently located.

== History ==
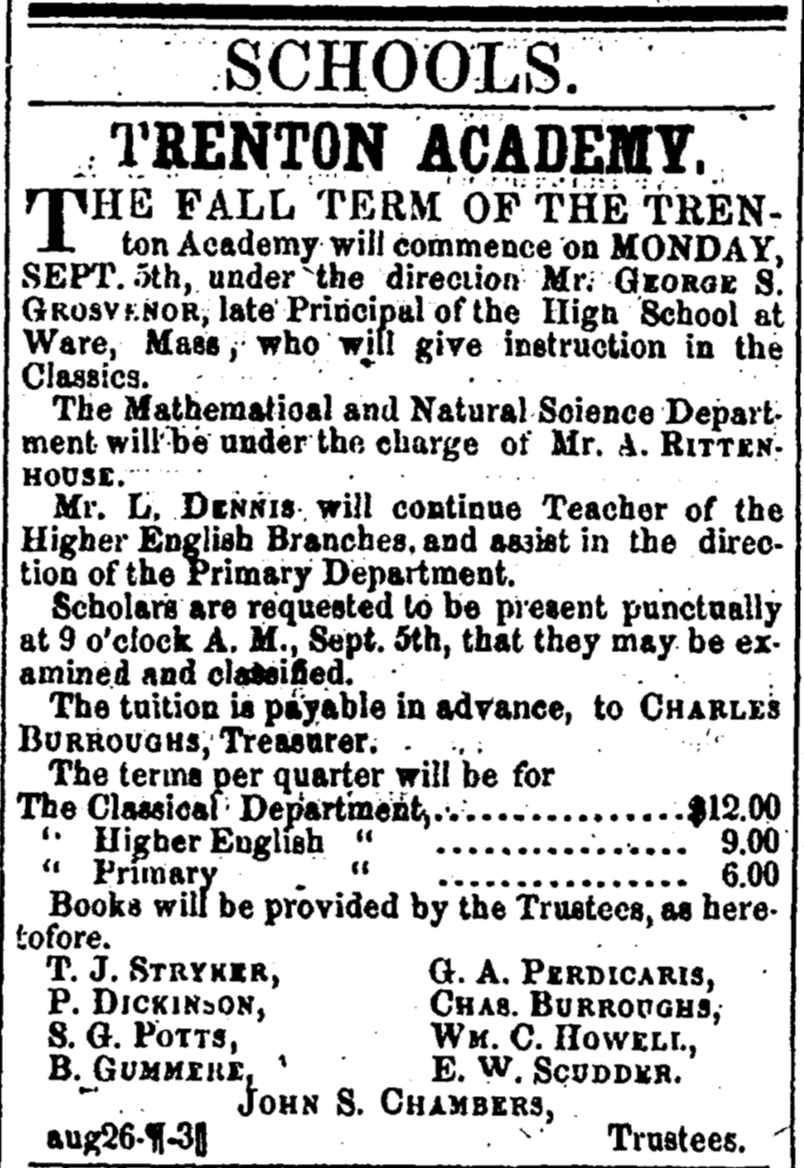
The Trenton Academy, September 14, 1859

In 1781 prominent members of the Trenton community created a company promoting the cause of education in the city. It was organized as a stock company and the board of trustees were elected annually from the stockholders. By 1785, the school was formally named Trustees of Trenton Academy. After 1789 the school issued a certificate under the seal of the corporation to scholars which studied the English language grammatically and gained competent knowledge of at least 2 branches of Extraction of the Roots, Algebra, Mathematics, Geography, Chronology, History Logic Rhetoric, Moral and Natural Philosophy, Spirit of Laws and Criticism, the students also read, what is usually read in schools: Caesars Commentaries or Ovid's Metamorphoses, Justin or Sallust in Latin and any two of the four following books, The New Testament, Lucian's Dialogue, Xenophon or Homer in Greek.

During the late 1790s, the Academy held a lottery to raise money. In 1800, they leased part of the Presbyterian church ground on State street for a girls' school. The Trustees of the Academy passed a resolution prohibiting the students from shooting guns within the limits of the school in the year 1807. In the winter of 1815-1816, the Academy was used by the Methodist church to hold one of the first Sunday schools in the country. The school flourished for many years as a notable institution in Trenton New Jersey. Many statesmen and notable citizens attended the institution.

In 1847 a new building was erected and the trustees reduced the tuition. By 1870 the principal of the academy was George R Grosvenor. The Trustees were Thomas J Stryker, Gregory Anthony Perdicaris, Barker Gummere, Philemon Dickinson, and John S. Chambers. By the year 1881, the school contained nineteen students and after 103 years around 1884, the school closed, currently the lot where the Trenton Academy once stood is now the Trenton Public Library. There is a plaque on the library describing the Trenton Academy.

== Trustees ==
- Stacy Potts 1781–1783, 1785-1787
- Moore Furman 1781, 1783-1791
- James Ewing 1781-1782
- Isaac Collins 1781–1784, 1786-1796
- William Houston 1781
- David Brearley 1782-1784
- Isaac Smith, 1782-1785
- Conrad Kotts 1783, 1785-1800
- Samuel W. Stockton 1784
- Benjamin Pitfield 1784
- Maskell Ewing 1788–1789, 1792, 1800
- Charles Tompkins 1790
- Peter Gordon 1791–1796, 1800
- Alexander Chambers Jr. 1794 1800
- Joseph Brearley 1798
- Randall Rickey 1798
- James S. Ewing 1804
- Gideon H Wells 1804-1817
- Charles Ewing 1804-1823
- George Sherman 1817, 1822-1830
- William Potts 1817-1821
- Zachariah Rossell 1821-1835
- Thomas L. Woodruff 1821-1830
- Charles Higbee 1823-1835
- John S Chambers 1830
- Charles Burroughs 1835-1861 (Former Mayor of Trenton)
- Henry W Green 1835-1847
- James Ewing 1835-1852
- Thomas J Stryker (1843-1872) Attended Civil War peace conference
- Francis A. Ewing 1843-1847
- Philemon Dickinson 1847-1881
- Rev Samuel Staar 1847-1858
- Stacy G. Potts 1847-1865
- William C. Howell 1847-1869
- Gregory Anthony Perdicaris 1847-1880
- Rev. John Hall 1887
- William L. Dayton 1847-1859
- Barker Gummere 1859-1881
- Edward W. Scudder 1859-1880
- John S. Chambers 1859-1880
- William S Stryker 1880-1881
- William Lewis Dayton Jr. 1880-1881

== Notable alumni ==
- Charles Conrad Abbott (1843–1919), archaeologist and naturalist
- J. Hart Brewer
- William L. Dayton (1807–1864), politician
- William Lewis Dayton Jr.
- Samuel R. Gummere
- William Stryker Gummere (1852–1933), lawyer who served as chief justice of the Supreme Court of New Jersey
- Thomas Story Kirkbride (1809–1883), physician, alienist and hospital superintendent
- Gershom Mott (1822–1884), United States Army officer and a General in the Union Army
- Ion Hanford Perdicaris (1840–1925), author, professor, lawyer, painter and playwright
- Washington Roebling (1837–1926), civil engineer who supervised the construction of the Brooklyn Bridge
- Charles Skelton
- Daniel Bailey Ryall
- William E Hoy
- James Hoy Jr.
