= Gregory Anthony Perdicaris =

Greek-American statesman and consul

Consul of the United States to Athens (Greece)
- In office January 7, 1838 – August 18, 1846
- Preceded by: Established
- Succeeded by: John W. Mulligan

Personal details
- Born: 1810 Naousa, Imathia, Ottoman Empire (now Greece)
- Died: April 18, 1883 (aged 72–73) Tangier, Morocco
- Party: Democratic Party (United States)
- Spouse: Margret (Meta) Perdicaris (m. 1837–1883)
- Children: Ion Hanford Perdicaris
- Education: Trinity College
- Profession: Lawyer, Statesman, Entrepreneur
- Known for: Business Modeling

Gregory Anthony Perdicaris (originally Gregores Antones Perdicaris, Greek: Γρηγόρης Αντώνης Περδικάρης; 1810 – April 18, 1883) was a Greek American statesman, lawyer, professor, author, and entrepreneur. Perdicaris raised awareness about Greece in the United States during the Greek War of Independence and was in Greece during the critical early years. He was the first Consul of the United States for Greece. He is known for incorporating dozens of companies in the United States. Perdicaris and partners built the municipal framework for gas and electric companies. He was associated with Dewing v. Perdicaries, 96 U.S. 193 (1877), the Supreme Court case dealing with Confederate Sequestration. He was a prominent resident of Trenton, New Jersey.

== Early life ==
Gregores Antones Perdicaris was born in Naousa, a city in the present Imathia regional unit of Macedonia, Greece. He was son of Antones Perdicaris a doctor and politician. The Perdicaris family is an aristocratic Greek family with centuries-old origins in Crete, Corfu and Monemvasia. The Patriarch Licinius, the personal doctor to the Ottoman Sultan, was named a Count by the Republic of Venice for his services, and was beheaded by the Ottomans for the same reason in 1715. Gregory Perdicaris was about 12 years old when he fled the Massacre of Naousa in 1822. Perdicaris and his father fled into the mountains. His two brothers-in-law were killed. His mother, two brothers, and four sisters were taken by the Ottomans and sold into slavery. He eventually fled to Izmir without his father. Afterward, he made his way to Jerusalem where he met Pliny Fisk. Fisk helped secure his passage to the United States. He was brought to America on the ship Romulus on July 7, 1826. On his way to the United States, he was told his family's freedom was purchased. He was sixteen and traveled with Nicolus Prassas and Nicolus Vlassopoulo, none of whom spoke English.

In the later part of the 1820s he learned English and taught at Mount Pleasant Classical Institute. While he was at Mount Pleasant he wrote Suffering Greece; the essay was published in local newspapers. It was an outcry to the people of the United States about war-torn Greece. While Perdicaris was at Mount Pleasant he taught with Petros Mengous author of the book Narrative of a Greek Soldier in 1830. Their students included John C. Zachos, Christophorus Plato Castanis, Alexandros Georgios Paspates, Constantine Fundulakes, and Christopher Evangeles.

By 1830, he was a professor at Washington College, now Trinity College in Hartford Connecticut. He was a Greek teacher from 1830 to 1832 and librarian at the institution from 1832 to 1833. He also obtained a master's degree at the college. Prominent future Harvard Professor Evangelinos Apostolides Sophocles lived in Hartford Connecticut during this period. Around 1834, Perdicaris wrote Dr. Coray and the Greek Church. The essay discussed the future of the Greek government and the Greek Church. Perdicaris traveled to many American cities lecturing about Greece from 1834-1837.

His lectures created awareness about the war-torn country and its current state. The themes varied from the: Moral and Intellectual Condition on Modern Greece, History and Topography of Macedonia, and the modern Greek language vs Ancient Greek. He also discussed education in the country prior to the war. He briefly lectured at Yale and Harvard University. Gregory was made an Honorary member of Yale's Phi Beta Kappa in 1834. Phi Beta Kappa eventually made him a life member. Some of the prominent locations he lectured included: the Franklin Institute, New York Mercantile Library, Washington D.C., and the Brooklyn Lyceum.

His lectures usually cost 50 cents per person, per lecture, and 2 dollars per person, for the entire series. American Poet Edgar Allan Poe enjoyed his lectures and featured two articles about them in the Southern Literary Messenger between 1836 and 1837. His lectures were so popular local newspapers gave Perdicaris rave reviews.

Around the fall of 1837, Perdicaris was in North Carolina lecturing. He suddenly stopped his lecture tour around May 1837. He married Margret Hanford on May 25, 1837, in Society Hill, South Carolina. Margret was the granddaughter of American Revolutionary War hero Captain William Dewitt. They were a politically elite Southern family of planters. Margret was an orphan but her sister Mary married into the family of Governor David Rogerson Williams. Mary's husband was State Congressman Alexander Markland McIver. Their son was Chief Justice of the South Carolina Supreme Court Henry McIver. Margret's uncle was Senator Josiah J. Evans.

== Greek consul ==
Greece was officially recognized by the United States in 1837. Gregory became the first American Consul to Athens, Greece in October 1837, under the appointment of President Martin Van Buren. It took Perdicaris and his wife sixty days to travel to Greece. He officially assumed his post in Athens, Greece on January 7, 1838. Perdicaris attended the Royal Court of King Otto and Queen Amalia. Perdicaris interacted with the heroes that helped Greece gain its independence. The diplomatic community consisted of dignitaries from 18 different countries. Some of the countries included: Austria, Bavaria, Belgium, Denmark, Great Britain, Hanover, Netherlands, Papal Dominions, Portugal, Russia, Prussia, Saxony, Sardinia, Tuscany, Two Sicily’s, Sweden, and the United States. Two notable members of the community were David Pacifico and Jonas King.

Gregory served both the United States and Greece during his time as Consul. He evaluated legal matters regarding the American missionaries that were living in Greece at the time. Gregory also helped gather American funding for different Greek projects. The National and Kapodistrian University of Athens was established. Perdicaris was a member of two American societies: the Natural History Society and the Archaeological Society. Perdicaris also joined the Educational Society (Φιλεκπαιδευτική Εταιρεία). This Greek organization helped establish schools in the country. Godey's Magazine published an article by Gregory Anthony Perdicaris in July 1841, entitled The Court of King Otho. Perdicaris discussed the Court of the King and how the Greek revolutionaries interacted with the foreign dignitaries.

Prominent Greek revolutionary Petrobey Mavromichalis was introduced to Unitarian Minister Charles Lowell of Massachusetts by his friend Perdicaris. Lowell was so taken by Mavromichalis that he published his plea for funds in American newspapers. Charles Lowell wrote the kindest words about the Spartan Greek war hero. In 1840, Perdicaris son Ion Hanford Perdicaris was born in Athens, Greece. Margret wrote letters about her experiences in Greece to Anna McIver, Henry McIver's sister. Anna archived the communications, they can be found in the Anna R. McIver Papers. Greece experienced a revolution around the time the King's Royal Palace was completed in Athens. The coup was called the 3 September 1843 Revolution. The King immediately agreed to the demands for a constitutional monarchy. Perdicaris was back in the United States in the latter part of 1843. The consul took a leave of absence.

Gregory wrote the Greece of Greeks. The book was published in the later part of 1845 in two volumes. The book outlines the time he spent in Greece. He describes the different cities he visited. He relayed what he observed, and the interactions he had with the local inhabitants. A notable part of the book describes a nun who had visions of an icon from the island of Dino just before Perdicaris arrived in Greece. He describes how the nun was instructed to find the icon of the Virgin. A church was built Our Lady of Tinos to house the holy relic. Perdicaris said that many pilgrims traveled to the holy church. Outside of the church, there was a festival to raise money. The money was used to build roads and help the newly formed democracy.

== Return to the United States ==
Gregory and his family settled in Trenton, New Jersey. They moved into the Perdicaris Ashley Cottage, a notable estate in Trenton. He resigned his position as consul on February 2, 1845. Records indicate he was considering a professorship in South Carolina. He finished his two-volume book while in the United States. In early 1846, he lectured about his book in Trenton at the Irving Institute. In May of the same year, he was the vice president of the Mexican–American War Committee. Other members of the committee included Mayor of Trenton Charles Burroughs and Governor Peter D Vroom. Perdicaris became a trustee at the Trenton Academy in 1847 he held this position until 1880. Other notable trustees included: William Lewis Dayton, Edward W. Scudder, Mayor Charles Burroughs, Samuel R. Gummeré’s father Barker Gummere. Perdicaris was a manager at the Trenton Saving Fund Society from 1847-1878. Notable managers of the society included: Samuel D. Ingham, Edward W. Scudder, Governor Peter D Vroom.

Perdicaris was active in the Democratic Party. He attended a meeting on March 5, 1847. In the summer, he attended the Committee for the Mexican-American War for a second year. The newspapers reported in November 1847, he lost the political race for New Jersey Assembly representing Mercer County. Xenophon J. Maynard, Joseph C. Potts, Perdicaris, and several others participated in the incorporation of the Trenton Gas Light Company on February 19, 1847. One year later Perdicaris was one of the directors. Perdicaris was now involved in the coal gas business. Joseph C. Potts, James Hoy Jr., and Perdicaris built the coal gas plant and infrastructure of Princeton Gas Light Company in 1849. That same year notable members of the Trenton community Peter Cooper, Abram Hewitt, and Perdicaris attended the New Jersey State Tariff Convention. Perdicaris participated in discussions regarding trade, they were adopted by the convention.

Perdicaris was the president of the Trenton Mutual Life and Fire Insurance Company in 1852. Perdicaris, Joseph C Potts, and Xenophon J. Maynard were on the Board of Directors of the Pacific Mutual Insurance Company. The secretary was James Hoy Jr. In 1852, Perdicaris presided as director of the Trenton Library with Charles Hewitt, Barker Gummere, and several others. Former Treasury Secretary Ingham was president. Perdicaris contributed to A Pronouncing Gazetteer with the pronunciation of the Greek language. Thomas A. Baldwin published the book in 1851.

On January 9, 1854, Perdicaris was involved with the Committee on the Inauguration of Governor-Elect Rodman McCamley Price. Perdicaris ran a campaign for School Trustee that same year with Democratic Mayor William Napton. He lost the election. He was secretary of the Camden & Amboy Rail Road and Transportation Company in 1856 and manager of the Trenton Water Works in 1858. During the year 1859, Perdicaris incorporated the Trenton City Bridge Company with Thomas J Stryker, Barker Gummere, and several others.

== Coal gas ==
The coal gas plants were a form of municipal infrastructure. The coal gas was supplied to street lamps throughout the cities. The town gas was also sent to people's homes. It was used to cook, illuminate and warm houses. The coal gas plants were eventually converted to gas and electric companies. Perdicaris played a major part in organizing the early framework. Perdicaris and Hoy were paid with stock certificates which they eventually sold into the open market. In some instances they were part of incorporating the coal gas company, then they hired Perdicaris and Hoy to build the plants and infrastructure.

Perdicaris and James Hoy Jr. started to build coal gas plants all over the country. Aaron Vancleve was the engineer. He owned an iron foundry in Trenton and was their business partner. Vancleve built plants in Virginia traveling from city to city. The cities included: Richmond, Wheeling, Alexandria and Petersburgh. Perdicaris and Hoy was the name brand of the company building the plants. Portsmouth Gas Company, Saint Paul Gas Light Company, Hudson and Bergen Gas Light Company, Natchez Gas Light Company, Macon Gas Light Company, Columbus Gas Light Company, Charleston Gas Light Company, and Charlottesville and University Gas Light are some of the companies involved with Perdicaris and Hoy. Eventually James Hoy's cousin John Patterson Kennedy became the coal gas plant engineer. Perdicaris and Hoy were in business from 1849 to 1860.

James Hoy retired leaving Perdicaris and Hoy. Kennedy Partnered with his sons James Hoy Jr and William Hoy. The new company was called Kennedy & Hoy. Kennedy & Hoy partnered with Cornelius Vanderbilt and his son to build the largest coal gas infrastructure in this countries history. The company was called the New York Mutual Gas Light Company and it was built in New York City. It was later absorbed by Con-Edison.

== American Civil War ==
Ion Hanford Perdicaris graduated from Trenton Academy with William Lewis Dayton Jr. and William Hoy in 1855. The next year he enrolled at Harvard as a freshman, he also displayed his painting Cattle at the Thirty-Third Annual Exhibition of the Pennsylvania Academy of the Fine Arts. Evangelinos Apostolides Sophocles was a professor at Harvard around this time. By the spring of 1858, Ion was no longer a student at Harvard. He traveled to England that summer to study painting.

Gregory was an active member of Trinity Church, which was formed in 1858. The church was built in Trenton on Academy St. around 1860. Perdicaris was elected vestryman on April 27, 1859. He was also a delegate to the diocesan convention that same year. He repeated this role the following year and was an active member of the church. The country was on the verge of war. Perdicaris was with the North and his wife was with her family in the South. A similar scenario to Theodore Roosevelt Sr. and his wife's family.

Margret's nephew Henry McIver was instrumental in removing South Carolina from the United States. He signed the Ordinance of Secession in December 1860. He demanded his first cousin Ion Hanford Perdicaris assist in the war efforts. Gregory was crucial because he was a former diplomat and had ties to many different countries in Europe namely the King and Queen of Greece. They were related to other royals throughout the European continent. Recall there were over 18 different countries represented with over 50 different consuls in the diplomatic community when they were in Greece. The information was relayed to the McIver's and can be found in the McIver papers.

The McIvers confiscated the family's assets one month after the onset of the civil war and three months before the official Confederate Sequestration Act. The McIver's did not hire a substitute for their cousin who was studying in Europe. They choose confiscation. One year later, the confederacy confiscated 1351 shares of the Charleston Gas Light Company, worth close to one million dollars, adjusted for 2019 inflation. The shares belonged to Gregory.

This resulted in the Supreme Court case Dewing v. Perdicaris, 96 U.S. 193 (1877). Ion Hanford Perdicaris according to his letter to Samuel R. Gummeré was instructed by his parents to obtain Greek citizenship to stop the sequestration. They found expatriation a legal solution. Expatriation was not legally allowable until the Expatriation Act of 1868. Records indicate Ion submitted his paperwork twenty-three days before the South sequestered close to one million dollars' worth of stocks. By law, he was still an American citizen.

== Later life ==
In the 1860s, Gregory was manager at the Trenton Saving Fund Society and the Trenton Bridge Company. He was very active in Trenton his duties included working at the waterworks and he was involved with the Delaware and Raritan Canal Company. He was heavily involved with municipal infrastructure. Perdicaris and his wife dedicated the continuation of State Street through their twelve-acre property. Their house the Perdicaris Ashley Cottage was torn down and rebuilt between Clinton and Chestnut. The 1870 map of Trenton reveals Perdicaris owned countless land parcels. He sold and rented houses.

By the year 1867, Perdicaris, Peter Cooper, Theodore Roosevelt Sr., and John C. Zachos all donated money for the Greek refugees of Crete to Samuel Gridley Howe. Perdicaris became very active in incorporating new companies in the late 1860s, early 1870s. Some of the companies included: Holmes Gold Company of Montana, Ransome Patent Stone Company, Hamilton Horse Car Railroad, Jersey Silver Mining Company, Rosario Silver Mining Company, Star Rubber Company, and The Poplar Creek Railroad, Coal, and Iron Company. Some of his business partners included Barker Gummeré, John A Roebling, Abram Hewitt's younger brother Charles Hewitt. Peter Cooper became really close friends with John C. Zachos. Zachos wrote his biography and was the curator of the library at Cooper Union. In 1877, Gregory's son Ion freed a slave in Morocco with the help of the United States government. It was widely publicized in Trenton newspapers.

In 1878, Perdicaris left his position at the bank after 31 years. He became president of the Princeton Gas Light Company. Two years later he retired from Trenton. Gregory and his wife moved to Tangier Morocco. He died three years later in 1883, his wife passed two years after his death. The city of Trenton honored Perdicaris by naming a street and neighborhood after him. In the early 20th century the Perdicaris Ave. Bridge in Trenton shared his name. His home town Naousa, also has 2 streets named after later members of the Perdicari family; the first is named after Christodoulos Perdicaris, a doctor and a leading figure in the independence struggle of Northern Greece/ Makedonia and the second after Georgios Perdicaris, a two-times town mayor. Gregory's son Ion inherited a massive fortune and was involved in the Perdicaris affair.

== Legacy ==
Perdicaris Place in Trenton, New Jersey, is named in his honor.

== Literary works ==
=== Essays ===
- Suffering Greece (Phenix Gazette, 1827)
- Dr. Coray and the Greek Church (The American Quarterly Observer Volume 2, 1834)
- The Court of King Otho (Godey's Lady's Book, Vol. 23, 1841)

=== Books ===
- The Greece of the Greeks Vol 1 1846
- The Greece of the Greeks Vol 2 1846

== See also ==
- Gas lighting

== Bibliography ==
- Andrianis, Demetrios Constantinos (2021). "Gregory Anthony Perdicaris" (PDF). New York, New York: Digital Academic Research Archives.
- Godfrey, Carlos Emmor (2021). Gregory Anthony Perdicaris, History of the Trenton Saving Fund Society: 1844-1919. Trenton, NJ: Privately Printed, 1919.
- Smith, Walter Burges (1987). America's Diplomats and Consuls of 1776-1865. Washington, D.C.: U.S. Government Printing Office.
