= Senator Scudder =

Senator Scudder may refer to:

- Edward W. Scudder (1822–1893), New Jersey State Senate
- Zeno Scudder (1807–1857), Massachusetts State Senate
