= The Wind and the Lion =

1975 film written and directed by John Milius

- Pre-release promotional poster
- Directed by: John Milius
- Written by: John Milius
- Produced by: Herb Jaffe
- Starring: Sean Connery; Candice Bergen; Brian Keith; John Huston
- Cinematography: Billy Williams
- Edited by: Robert L. Wolfe
- Music by: Jerry Goldsmith
- Production companies: Metro-Goldwyn-Mayer; Herb Jaffe Productions
- Distributed by: United Artists (U.S.); Columbia Pictures (International)
- Release dates: May 22, 1975 (New York City, premiere); May 23, 1975 (U.S.)
- Running time: 119 minutes
- Country: United States
- Language: English
- Budget: $4.5 million or $4.2 million
- Box office: $9.2 million (rentals)

The Wind and the Lion is a 1975 American epic historical adventure film written and directed by John Milius, and starring Sean Connery, Candice Bergen, Brian Keith, and John Huston. The film is loosely based on the real-life Perdicaris affair of 1904. Connery plays Mulai Ahmed er Raisuli, a Moroccan Berber rebel and anti-imperialist leader, and Bergen plays his American hostage Eden Pedecaris, a fictional character inspired by Ion Hanford Perdicaris.

Milius' second feature film as a director, it was produced by Herb Jaffe for Metro-Goldwyn-Mayer, and distributed in the U.S. by United Artists and internationally by Columbia Pictures. It received generally positive reviews from critics, and was a moderate commercial success. Jerry Goldsmith’s film score received Academy Award, BAFTA Award and Grammy Award nominations. Milius was nominated for a Writers Guild of America Award for his screenplay.

== Plot ==
In 1904, Morocco is the source of conflict among the colonial powers of Germany, France, and the British Empire. Each nation is trying to establish a sphere of influence in that country. Mulai Ahmed er Raisuli is the leader of a band of Berber insurrectionists opposed to the young Sultan Abdelaziz and his uncle, the Bashaw of Tangier. Raisuli considers the Bashaw to be corrupt and beholden to the Europeans. He kidnaps the American Eden Pedecaris and her children, William and Jennifer, in a raid on their home. Sir Joshua Smith, a British consul and a friend of Eden's, is killed during the raid. Raisuli then issues an outrageous ransom demand, deliberately attempting to provoke an international incident in order to embarrass the Sultan and start a civil war.

In the United States, President Theodore Roosevelt is seeking election to a full term. He decides to use the kidnapping as both political propaganda (coining the phrase "Pedecaris alive or Raisuli dead!") and as an effort to demonstrate America's military strength as a new great power, despite the protests of his cautious Secretary of State, John Hay.

The American Consul to Tangier, Samuel Gummeré, is unable to negotiate a peaceful return of the hostages. In response, Roosevelt sends the South Atlantic Squadron, under the command of Admiral French Ensor Chadwick, to Tangier, either to retrieve Pedecaris or to force the Sultan to accede to Raisuli's demands. Roosevelt finds himself gaining more and more respect for Raisuli, thinking him an honorable man who just happens to be his enemy.

The Pedecarises are kept as hostages in the Rif, far from any potential rescuers. Though her children seem to admire Raisuli, Eden finds him "a brigand and a lout". The Pedecarises attempt an escape, helped by one of Raisuli's men, but they are betrayed and given to a gang of desert brigands. Luckily, Raisuli has tracked them and kills the kidnappers with a rifle and sword. He reveals that he does not have any intention of harming the Pedecarises and is merely bluffing. Eden and Raisuli come to develop a friendly relationship as Raisuli reveals his story, that he was once taken captive by his brother, the Bashaw, and kept in a dungeon for several years.

Gummeré, Chadwick, and his aide, Marine Captain Jerome, tire of the Sultan's perfidy and the meddling of the European powers and decide to engage in "military intervention" to force a negotiation by seizing the actual seat of power, the Bashaw's palace in Tangier. Jerome's company of Marines, supported by a detachment of sailors, march through the streets of Tangier, much to the surprise of the European legations, whose forces are with the Sultan at distant Fez. They overwhelm the Bashaw's palace guard, taking the Bashaw hostage and forcing him to negotiate.

Under coercion, the Bashaw finally agrees to accede to the Raisuli's demands. But during a hostage exchange, Raisuli is betrayed and captured by German and Moroccan troops under the command of von Roerkel. Jerome and a small contingent of Marines are present to secure Pedecaris and her children. Raisuli's friend, the Sherif of Wazan, organizes the Berber tribe for an attack on the Europeans and Moroccans, while Eden suddenly attacks Jerome. She convinces him and his men at gunpoint to rescue Raisuli to uphold the word of President Roosevelt that Raisuli will be unharmed if the Pedecaris family are returned safely.

A three-way battle ensues, in which the Berbers and Americans team up to defeat the Germans and their Moroccan allies, rescuing Raisuli in the process. In the United States, Roosevelt is cheered for this great victory, and the Pedecarises arrive safely back in Tangier. Later, Roosevelt reads a letter he received from Raisuli, comparing the two men:

"To Theodore Roosevelt - You are like the wind and I like the lion. You form the tempest. The sand stings my eyes and the ground is parched. I roar in defiance but you do not hear. But between us there is a difference. I, like the lion, must remain in my place. While you, like the wind, will never know yours. - Mulay Ahmed Mohammed El Raisuli the magnificent, Lord of the Rif, Sultan to the Berbers."

== Cast ==
- Sean Connery as the Mulai Ahmed er Raisuni
- Candice Bergen as Eden Pedecaris (based on Ion Hanford Perdicaris)
- Brian Keith as President Theodore Roosevelt
- John Huston as Secretary of State John Hay
- Geoffrey Lewis as Samuel R. Gummeré
- Vladek Sheybal as the Bashaw of Tangier
- Steve Kanaly as Captain Jerome (based on John Twiggs Myers)
- Roy Jenson as Admiral French Ensor Chadwick
- Nadim Sawalha as the Sherif of Wazan
- Darrell Fetty as Vice-Consul Richard Dreighton
- Marc Zuber as Sultan Abdelaziz
- Antoine Saint-John as Oberst von Roerkel
- Simon Harrison as William Pedecaris
- Polly Gottesman as Jennifer Pedecaris
- Deborah Baxter as Alice Roosevelt
- Jack Cooley as Quentin Roosevelt
- Chris Aller as Kermit Roosevelt
- Shirley Rothman as Edith Roosevelt
- Larry Cross as Henry Cabot Lodge
- Aldo Sambrell as Ugly Arab
- Luis Barboo as Gayaan "the Terrible"
- Benjamin Tatar as Sketch Artist
- Michael Damian as William Loeb Jr.
- Akio Mitamura as Takahira Kogorō

Several members of the film's crew make supporting and cameo appearances: writer-director John Milius as a one-armed German military advisor, director of photography Billy Williams as British consul Sir Joshua Smith, special effects supervisor Alex Weldon as US Secretary of War Elihu Root, and stunt coordinator Terry Leonard as Roosevelt's sparring partner Dan Tyler Moore.

== Development ==
=== Writing ===
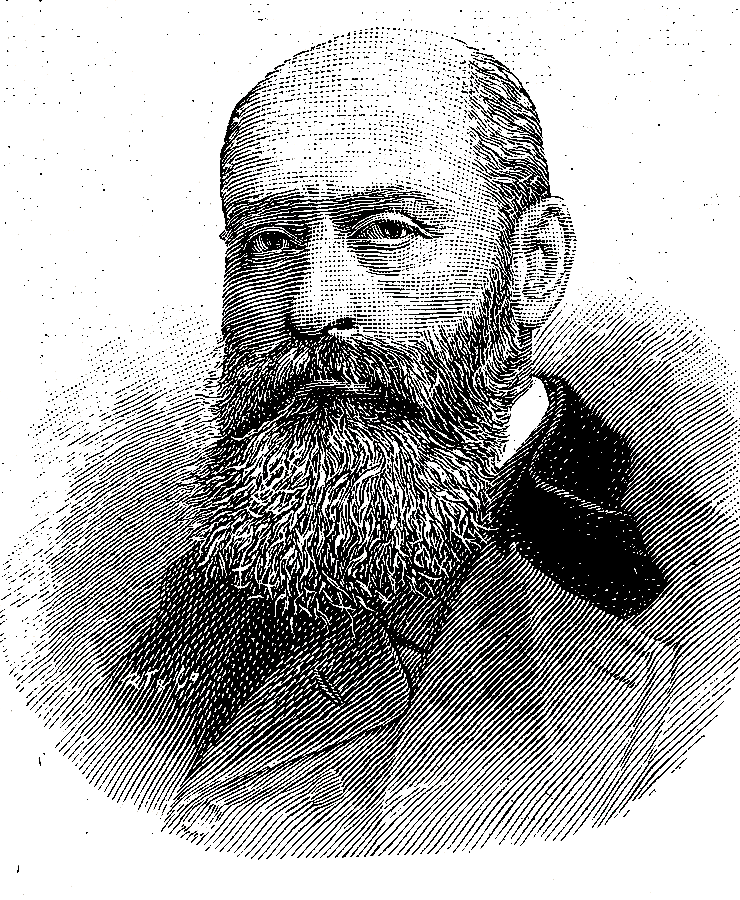
The 1904 kidnapping of Ion Hanford Perdicaris (see: Perdicaris affair) inspired the film's events.

John Milius' inspiration had come from reading an article by Barbara W. Tuchman about the Perdicaris affair in American Heritage magazine, and he found the story fascinating; he decided to adapt it into a screenplay once he figured how to make the story more cinematic, by making Ion Hanford Perdicaris a woman, Eden Pedecaris. Milius also researched Rosita Forbes's 1924 biography of Mulai Ahmed er Raisuni, The Sultan of the Mountains; much of the film's dialogue is appropriated almost word-for-word from Forbes's book. Walter Harris's 1921 book Morocco That Was inspired the depiction of Sultan Abdelaziz's court. Milius took similar care in researching the scenes with Theodore Roosevelt.

Milius says he originally wanted Mrs. Pedecaris to be 55 or 60 and played by Katharine Hepburn with the children William and Jennifer being her grandchildren, and the Berber would be a similar age. Milius:

Her husband has died years ago, she's a stern, rich old woman, and she has a last romantic fling with this stern, rich old Berber, the Sultan of the mountains, who can't really do all the things he used to do but pulls it together one more time to save her from the Blue People. A very heroic character. And of course the children would look at such a character as being even greater than Sean Connery – this old man would be the greatest old thing they'd ever seen, and they'd have great admiration for their grandmother for standing up to him, the way old people can snipe at each other and love each other because they have the common bond of age. That was the purest form the movie ever had. Roosevelt was a very young, visceral presence, a vibrant man who represented a new world, who understood Raisuli's world very well but was forced to change it.

Milius had to make the leading characters younger to get the film financed. "No one wanted to make a movie about Arabs and Teddy Roosevelt. So we had to make concessions: a more romantic male, a beautiful woman, much more box office that way. You make these concessions as you go along and perhaps, at a certain point in your career, you don't have to make them, and you make Barry Lyndon. Maybe it's better that you make concessions".

=== Influences ===
Milius stated both in interviews and the DVD commentary that he was consciously echoing a number of classic adventure films and stories. He cites the famous British periodical Boy's Own, as well as the stories of Rudyard Kipling, as inspirations for the film.

Milius said the film was a "boy's adventure movie ... seen through children's eyes ... I'm sick of seeing children used as a point of view when they're sitting there blanching with terror".

1930s adventure films like Gunga Din and The Four Feathers provided inspiration for the film's style and storytelling technique. The use of children as protagonists is also inspired by the book and the film A High Wind in Jamaica, while the relationship between Raisuli and Eden (Candice Bergen) is based on the 1921 film The Sheik. Raisuli's rescue of the Pedecarises on the beach is similar to another mounted sword-fighting scene in Akira Kurosawa's 1958 film The Hidden Fortress, and the scene of Jennifer (Polly Gottesman) being cornered by Aldo Sambrell's character the Ugly Arab and kidnapped is a reference to the 1956 film The Searchers.

Most noticeably, the film inherits a cavalier attitude towards imperialism, foreign policy, and military intervention, attitudes which were relatively unpopular in 1975 America at the end of the Vietnam War. Milius' apparent endorsement of imperialism was not attacked by critics, perhaps due to the film's subtle satiric manner and for the accurate recreation of the era in which its story is set.

"I think people should take home more understanding – or rather awareness – of what I think is the American character", said Milius. "It's very well put in the grizzly bear. I don't think Americans are necessarily civilised or too calm and rational about their approach to life. I rather like that. I really like grizzly bears too. I like grizzly bears a lot more than most people ... You can take the [film's] politics to be anyway you want, for or against the United States".

Milius also had inspiration from more recent films while making the film. He based the film's cinematography, use of desert landscapes, and filming of battle scenes on David Lean's 1962 film Lawrence of Arabia, also using many of the same sets, including the Aqaba set which had been constructed for Lean's film, here serving as the setting for the final, three-way battle between the Berbers, the Europeans and their Moroccan allies, and the Americans. The Bashaw's palace was the Palace of the Americas in Seville, having appeared in both Lawrence of Arabia and Anthony Mann's 1961 film El Cid. Another major influence is the 1969 film The Wild Bunch, which inspired the final confrontation between the American and German troops and the earlier scene where Sultan Abdelaziz (Marc Zuber) test-fires his Maxim gun.

== Production ==
The film was a co production between MGM, then under the control of Daniel Melnick, and Columbia Pictures, then run by Peter Guber. It was produced by Herb Jaffe making his first film as an independent after five years as head of production at United Artists.

=== Casting ===
Milius originally wanted Omar Sharif to play Raisuli and Faye Dunaway to play Eden Pedecaris, but Sharif refused the part and Dunaway became ill due to exhaustion, having to be replaced at short notice by Bergen. Anthony Quinn was also considered for Raisuli. Milius said he wrote the part of Eden with Julie Christie in mind, although she may not have actually been approached for the role. Milius later said he did not particularly enjoy working with Bergen or Connery, particularly Connery because he was so "sour and dour". He greatly admired Connery's performance, whereas he felt Bergen's acting range was extremely limited, and she was only concerned with looking good.

Milius wanted Orson Welles to play newspaper magnate Charles Foster Kane (the name of his character in Citizen Kane) in the film, but the studio would not let him as they were worried about being sued by RKO. Instead, he used the character of William Randolph Hearst, the real-life figure Kane was based on.

Several of the crew are cast, most notably the cinematographer Billy Williams (perhaps best known for Ken Russell's 1969 film Women in Love), who plays the gun-shooting, white-suited Englishman Sir Joshua Smith in the opening scenes of the attack at the Pedecaris villa and stunt supervisor Terry Leonard as Roosevelt's sparring partner. The special effects supervisor Alex Weldon appears as Roosevelt's Secretary of War, Elihu Root, and Milius himself cameos as the one-armed German officer who gives the Sultan his Maxim gun to test-fire ("Herr Sultan is displeased?").

=== Filming ===
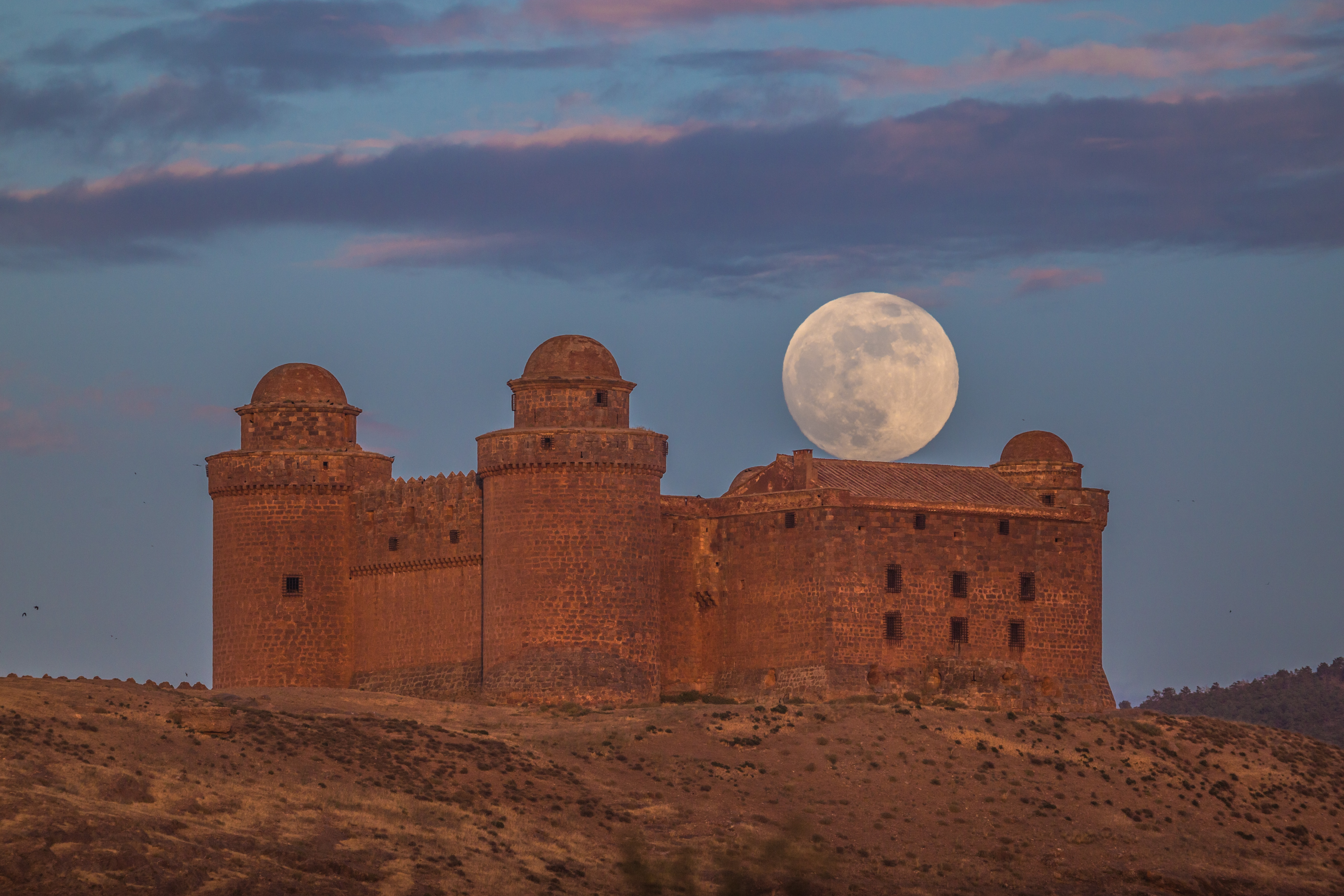
The Castillo de La Calahorra.

The Alcázar of Seville, which portrayed both Abdelaziz and the Bashaw's palaces.

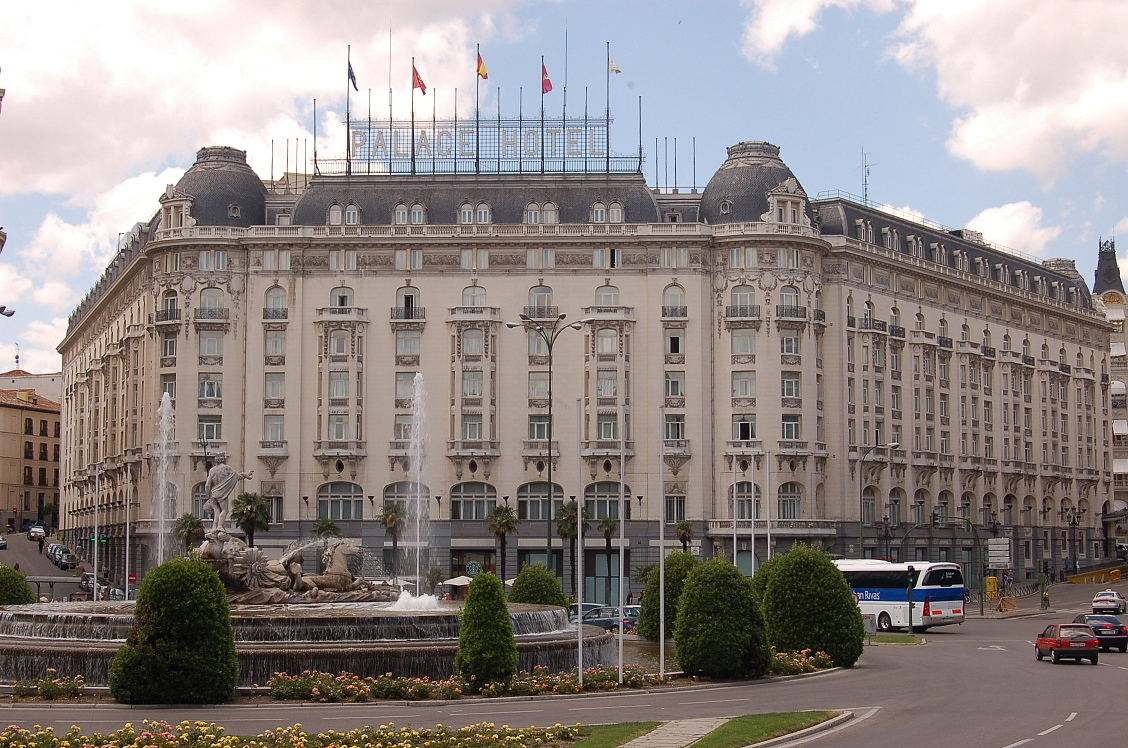
The Palace Hotel Madrid, which doubled for the White House interiors.

Filming was done in Spain, with the towns of Seville, Granada, Almería and Madrid all doubling for Tangier and Fez, and the Washington, D.C. scenes being filmed in and around Madrid. For the deserts of Morocco, Milius used many locations in Almonte and the province of Almería, some of which had been previously used in historical epics such as Lawrence of Arabia and El Cid, as well as several Spaghetti Westerns; Milius claims to have discovered the beach where Raisuli rescues the Pedecaris family after their escape.

The scene at Raisuli's headquarters was filmed at the castle of La Calahorra (Granada). The scene at Yellowstone National Park, where Roosevelt (Brian Keith) gives his grizzly bear speech was filmed in the Meseta Central, north of Madrid. These latter two locations would each re-appear in Milius' 1982 film Conan the Barbarian.

The Marines and sailors used in the Tangier attack scene were Spanish special forces troops, along with a handful of U. S. Marine Corps and United States Navy personnel from the naval base in Rota (Cádiz), who marched with precision through the streets of Seville and Almería en route to the Bashaw's palace.

According to Milius, virtually all of the film's stunts were performed by Terry Leonard. Leonard was the stunt coordinator and did some of the stunts and also has a minor part as Roosevelt's boxing opponent early in the film. Milius claims that only four American stunt men were used in the entire final battle scene; the number of Spanish stunt men was close to twenty throughout the filming. He and Leonard defended the film against criticism for alleged animal cruelty, claiming that not a single horse was seriously hurt during filming. While filming this scene, Antoine Saint-John revealed himself to be terrified of horses, and would often hide somewhere on the set when his sword fight with Connery was to be filmed.

=== Music ===
The score to The Wind and the Lion was composed and conducted by Jerry Goldsmith. True to the style of such Golden Age scores as Maurice Jarre's Lawrence of Arabia, Goldsmith used a diverse ensemble that relied heavily upon a large percussion section and a variety of Moroccan instrumentation. The music went on to earn Goldsmith an Academy Award nomination, though he lost to fellow composer John Williams for Jaws. It is often regarded as one of the best scores of his career and was one of the American Film Institute's 250 nominees for the top 25 American film scores.

== Reception ==
A marquee advertising the film in Boston

The Wind and the Lion debuted in New York during May 1975 and Britain in October. The film was a financial success, though Steven Spielberg's hit film Jaws distracted attention away from it.

=== Critical response ===
On Rotten Tomatoes, the film has an approval rating of 63% based on reviews from 16 critics. On Metacritic the film has a score of 69% based on reviews from 9 critics, indicating "generally favorable reviews".

Variety called it "Generally literate and very commercial period action drama, well written and better directed by John Milius."

Shortly after its release, the film was screened for U.S. President Gerald Ford and his staff, who reportedly loved it.

=== Awards and nominations ===
At the 48th Academy Awards, the film was nominated for Best Original Score (Jerry Goldsmith) and Best Sound (Harry W. Tetrick, Aaron Rochin, William McCaughey, Roy Charman). The film was also nominated for the BAFTA Award for Best Original Music at the 29th British Academy Film Awards and the Grammy Award for Best Score Soundtrack for Visual Media at the 18th Annual Grammy Awards. Additionally, Milius' screenplay was nominated for the Writers Guild of America Award for Best Drama Written Directly for the Screen at the 28th Writers Guild of America Awards.

== Novelization ==
A novelization was published by Award Books in January 1975. Based on the screenplay, the story is slightly different from the finished film, with several additional scenes (notably, Eden Pedecaris taking a bath at Raisuli's palace and Samuel R. Gummeré watching the Atlantic Squadron arrive in Tangier) included, and the story's chronology is slightly different. The first printing included a chapter about production events and brief biographies of the cast and crew.

== Home media ==
It was released in 1991 on LaserDisc from Warner Home Video in a letterboxed format.

In Region 1, Warner Home Video released the film on DVD on January 6, 2004, featuring a brief production featurette, the theatrical trailer, and a commentary by Milius. Sony Pictures Home Entertainment has released a bare-bones DVD in Australia (R4) and in several European markets (Region 2), notably Germany, though not yet in the United Kingdom (the Sony release is English-friendly though).

A Blu-ray edition of the film from the Warner Archive Collection was released on April 29, 2014.

== See also ==
- List of American films of 1975
