= Trentoniana =

Coordinates: 40.222013°N 74.763502°W

The Trentoniana Local History and Genealogy Collection is a library-based special collection of historic memorabilia in Trenton, New Jersey. Held by the Trenton Free Public Library Board of Trustees, the collection contains books, manuscripts, ephemera, visual and audio media, and artifacts, with particular focus on local history and genealogical materials.

Although the Trenton Public Library dates back to 1750, the current organization was founded in 1900. In 1909, the founding Trustees declared their intention to build a special collection on Trenton's history.

== Holdings ==
Items in the collection include:

- a 10-foot piece of the wooden arch under which President-elect George Washington rode on his return to Trenton in 1789
- a large hand-made device built to explain the concept of electricity to students at the Trenton Academy, a private school that was once located on the lot where the Trenton Public Library now stands
- personal family genealogies for thousands of Trenton residents
- intricate watch fobs created from horsehair and walnut shells by inmates at the Trenton State Prison
- original Trenton Police Department logs from 1892 through 1913
- records of the fundraising drive begun by the Mercer County Soldiers' and Sailors' Monument Association in 1891 to erect the veterans' monument that stands in Cadwalader Park

Trentoniana's collection of more than 200,000 images of the city and its citizens includes tintypes, glass plate negatives, lantern slides, vintage postcards, cabinet cards, black and white photographic prints, 35 mm color slides and digital images.

In addition to newspaper clippings, annual reports, and promotional materials, Trentoniana’s holdings document the city's business history, including expense and payroll ledgers, business correspondence, letterhead and logo collections and samples of some of the many Trenton-made products that launched the motto, “Trenton Makes, the World Takes,” including pottery, watches, tile, iron rope, and a Horsman doll.

Trentoniana has also become the designated repository for the archival collections of many local organizations, including the Trenton Lions, YMCA, the Trenton Historical Society, the Mill Hill Society, Trenton Rotary, and the Jewish Historical Society of the Greater Trenton Area.

While resources in the collection do not circulate, materials may be viewed by the public at the library.
