= Henry McIver (judge) =

American judge

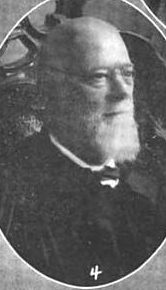

Chief Justice of South Carolina
- In office December 1, 1891 – January 12, 1903
- Preceded by: William D. Simpson
- Succeeded by: Young J. Pope

Associate Justice of South Carolina
- In office May 19, 1877 – December 1, 1891
- Preceded by: Ammiel J. Willard
- Succeeded by: Young J. Pope

Personal details
- Born: September 25, 1826 Society Hill, South Carolina, US
- Died: January 12, 1903 (aged 76) Cheraw, South Carolina, US
- Spouse: Caroline Harrington Powe

Henry McIver (September 25, 1826 – January 12, 1903) was a chief justice on the South Carolina Supreme Court.

McIver was born on September 25, 1826, near Society Hill, South Carolina to Alexander McIver and Mary Hanford McIver. His Great-grandfather was Captain William Dewitt. His uncle was Gregory Anthony Perdicaris and his first cousin was Ion Hanford Perdicaris. He moved to Cheraw, South Carolina in 1836 with his family. In 1846, he graduated from South Carolina College (now the University of South Carolina). He studied law with his father after college, and he was admitted to practice law in December 1847. He married Caroline H. Powe on June 7, 1849. When McIver's father died in July 1850, Governor Whitemarsh B. Seabrook appointed McIver to complete his father's term as the solicitor (prosecutor) for the eastern circuit of the state. At the end of the term, McIver did not run for a full term; however, the successor himself died in office, and McIver was again appointed to conclude the unexpired term. At the end of that second term, McIver was elected to a full term. He continued being re-elected to the position until 1868 when he was removed from office as part of Reconstruction. McIver, representing Chesterfield District, was among signers of the South Carolina's Ordinance of Secession in December 1860. He later served as a captain in the 4th South Carolina Cavalry Regiment and was severely wounded at the battle of Haw's Shop, Va., then returned to his law practice after the Civil War. On May 19, 1877, he was elected as an associate justice of the South Carolina Supreme Court to fill the unexpired term of the Justice Ammiel J. Willard who had become chief justice of the court. The General Assembly elected McIver unanimously to a full term in December 1879. He served in that position until he was elected and immediately sworn in as chief justice on December 1, 1891, replacing Chief Justice William D. Simpson.

McIver died on January 12, 1903.
