= Ammiel J. Willard =

American judge (1822–1900)

Chief Justice of South Carolina
- In office May 15, 1877 – July 30, 1880
- Preceded by: Franklin J. Moses, Sr.
- Succeeded by: William D. Simpson

Associate Justice of South Carolina
- In office 1868 – May 15, 1877
- Preceded by: None (court reformed in 1868)
- Succeeded by: Henry McIver

Personal details
- Born: June 21, 1822 Albany, New York
- Died: May 5, 1900 (aged 77) Washington, D.C.
- Resting place: Arlington National Cemetery

Ammiel J. Willard (June 21, 1822 – May 5, 1900) was a chief justice on the South Carolina Supreme Court. He was born in Albany, New York in 1822. He studied law under Willis Hall, the attorney-general of New York, before being made assistant counsel of New York City in 1848.

Willard came to South Carolina during the Civil War as a lieutenant colonel for black troops in the Union army. In November 1864, his regiment took part in the Battle of Honey Hill. In 1866, he was serving on a military commission in Charleston, South Carolina and was involved in the prosecution of three residents of Anderson, South Carolina for the murder of a Northern soldier; the case brought attention to Willard even though the defendants were later released. When the South Carolina Supreme Court was reconstituted in 1868 under the Reconstruction government, Willard was made an associate justice along with Solomon L. Hoge and Chief Justice F.J. Moses. Because Chief Justice Moses suffered poor health, much of the operation of the court fell on Willard.

On May 15, 1877, Willard was elected chief justice of the South Carolina Supreme Court by the South Carolina General Assembly, beating Samuel McGowan by a vote of 86–39. In an early opinion of tremendous political consequence, after the election of 1876, Willard cast the deciding vote in favor of Wade Hampton III as South Carolina's first governor after Reconstruction. As a result of his support of Hampton, Willard fell out of favor with the South Carolina Republicans, and Willard's position on the court was challenged. Willard himself claimed that, when he was elected in May 1877, the General Assembly had had no choice but to elect him to a full six-year term as set in the state constitution. His opposition, however, argued that he had been elected to fill only the unexpired portion of Chief Justice Moses's own six-year term. At what would have been the expiration of Chief Justice Moses's own six-year term, the Republican opposition convinced Governor Simpson to resign on September 1, 1880, and elected him to assume the position of chief justice. The dispute was heard by the South Carolina Supreme Court's other two justices and one trial judge sitting by designation who decided on October 15, 1880, that Chief Justice Willard's term had been only for the unexpired balance of his predecessor's tenure; thus, former Governor Simpson assumed the office of chief justice.

Having lost the chief justiceship, Willard moved to Washington, D.C., in 1884. He died at his home in Washington, D.C., on May 5, 1900, and is buried at Arlington National Cemetery.
