= Isaac Bell Jr. =

American diplomat (1846–1889)

Isaac Bell, Jr.
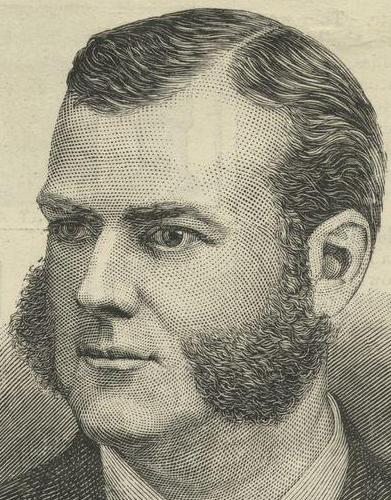

United States Ambassador to the Netherlands
- In office June 8, 1885 – April 29, 1888
- President: Grover Cleveland
- Preceded by: William Lewis Dayton Jr.
- Succeeded by: Robert B. Roosevelt

Personal details
- Born: November 6, 1846 New York City, US
- Died: January 20, 1889 (aged 42) New York City, US
- Resting place: Green-Wood Cemetery
- Party: Democratic
- Spouse: Jeanette Gordon Bennett (m. 1878)
- Relations: James G. Bennett Jr. (brother-in-law)
- Children: 3
- Parent(s): Isaac Bell; Adelaide Mott
- Education: Harvard University

Isaac Bell Jr. (November 6, 1846 – January 20, 1889) was an American businessman and diplomat.

== Early life ==
Bell was born in New York City, the son of steamboat owner Isaac Bell (1814–1897) and Adelaide (née Mott) Bell (1828–1901). Bell was the 13th Isaac Bell of his line, with his ancestor landing on the shores of the New Haven colony in 1640. His two younger brothers were Louis Valentine Bell (1853–1925) and Edward Bell (1860–1902), who married Helen A. Wilmerding (1856–1936), a daughter of Henry A. Wilmerding. His sister was Mrs. James L. Barclay (d. 1893).

His maternal grandfather, Valentine Mott (1785–1865), was a prominent American surgeon who had been court surgeon to Louis Philippe of France.

He attended Harvard University in 1866 and 1867 as a member of the class of 1870, but left without graduating.

== Career ==
He was a successful cotton broker and investor. He was one of the key investors in the Commercial Cable Company that broke the Transatlantic cable monopoly.

In 1883, he built the Isaac Bell House, one of the famous Gilded Age summer "cottages" in Newport, Rhode Island. The house, designed by McKim, Mead, and White, is considered of the best remaining examples of Shingle Style architecture. In New York, he owned a unit in one of New York City's first cooperative duplex apartment buildings, the "Knickerbocker".

He was active in Rhode Island politics as a Democrat. President Grover Cleveland appointed him the U.S. Minister to the Netherlands, and he served from 1885 to 1888. He was also a delegate to the 1888 Democratic National Convention.

== Personal life ==
In 1878, he married Jeanette Gordon Bennett (d. 1936), daughter of New York Herald founder James Gordon Bennett Sr. and sister of publisher James Gordon Bennett Jr. Together, they were the parents of three children, one boy and two girls: Isaac Bell (b. 1879), who lived in Shaftesbury, England and was Master of Hounds for South and West Wiltshire, Nora (née Bell) Ricardo, and Henrietta "Rita" (née Bell) d'Aramon (b. 1882).

In 1902, his daughter Rita became engaged to Count Raoul "Paul" d'Aramon (1876–1926), a twin son of Count Jacques d'Aramon and the Countess (an American who was born Mary Fischer who died in 1932). The wedding was postponed briefly in July 1902 due to the death of the Marquise d'Aramon. The couple eventually married in September 1902 at the Saint-Honoré-d'Eylau Church in Paris in what was described as a "Brilliant Social Function". The wedding was attended by Gen. Horace Porter, Mrs. Leach, Mrs. Scott, Mrs. Moore, Mrs. Frank Koster, Kendal Shaw, and Mrs. Austin Lee, but not by the bride's uncle, James Gordon Bennett Jr., as there was a reported coolness between him and his sister. After their marriage, the Count and Countess lived in Paris.

In January 1889, gravely ill from typhoid fever and pyaemia, he was brought by steamboat from Newport, R.I., to St. Luke's Hospital in New York City. He died there two weeks later. His funeral was held at Trinity Church, and he was buried in Green-Wood Cemetery in Brooklyn, New York. After his death, his family moved abroad and returned home occasionally to visit New York and Newport.

Diplomatic posts
Preceded by William L. Dayton Jr.	U.S. Minister to the Netherlands; 1885–1888	Succeeded by Robert Roosevelt
