= William Dewitt =

American politician (1738–1813)

Member of the South Carolina House of Representatives from St. David's Parish
- In office January 18, 1782 – March 25, 1784

Member of the South Carolina Senate from St. David's Parish
- In office January 8, 1784 – 1806

Personal details
- Born: 1738 Fredericksburgh, Virginia, Province of Virginia, British America
- Died: July 18, 1813 (aged 74–75) Darlington, South Carolina, US
- Resting place: Trinity Cemetery, Society Hill, South Carolina
- Profession: lawyer, politician

Military service
- Allegiance: United States of America
- Branch/service: Continental Army; United States Army
- Years of service: 1777–1783
- Rank: Captain
- Battles/wars: American Revolutionary War

William Dewitt (1738 – July 18, 1813) was a South Carolina planter, lawyer, and politician who was a Captain in the American Revolutionary War. He was a Member of the South Carolina House of Representatives 6 years after the signing of the Declaration of Independence. He attended the South Carolina ratifying convention in Charleston. He was one of the delegates that agreed to ratify the Constitution of the United States of America.

== Early life ==
William Dewitt was born in Fredericksburgh, Virginia to Martin Dewitt and Ellen Douthel. William Dewitt was an educated man. In 1764, he married Mary Devonald and had ten children. Their first son John Dewitt was born in 1765. Three years later Paul Revere protested the Stamp Act. On October 4, 1768, the parish of Saint David in Craven County South Carolina was established. William Dewitt was a member of the assembly. William was elected Church Officer of Saint David Parish on April 20, 1772 and also served as a member of the Grand Jury in the Cheraw region of South Carolina.

By April 15, 1775, William Dewitt and the members of the Grand Jury in the Cheraw region were unhappy with the British Crown, and rebellion was about to ensue. Dewitt was now 37 years old. The first battles began in Massachusetts. William Dewitt his father Martin Dewitt and both sons John and Charles took an active role in the American Revolution.

== American Revolution ==
On March 26, 1776, due to the ongoing conflict and civil unrest William Dewitt was nominated Justice of the Peace. On December 13, 1777, Saint David's (Society) Academy was founded to promote education in the Cheraw area. Dewitt was a member of the Society.

DeWitt joined the Continental Army and served as a Captain under the command of General Moultrie and he fought in the battle at Coosawhatchie on May 3, 1779.

The British attacked Captain DeWitt’s family. His wife and son John were harassed at their house by a party of British. John DeWitt was cut on the head with a sword by an officer, inflicting a scar. Subsequently, Captain DeWitt's house on Cedar Creek in Society Hill, South Carolina was burned by Tories along with all his personal belongings. Dewitt temporarily relocated his family to North Carolina and he rejoined the war effort, serving under the command of General Francis Marion.

On September 17, 1781, Governor John Rutledge wrote to General Marion. Rutledge allowed General Marion to hold special elections. William Dewitt was elected to the House of Representatives for Saint David's. William Dewitt, and William Pegues, were two of six representatives elected for Saint David's and took their seats in the House on January 18, 1882. The location was Jacksonborough South Carolina.

== Road to Constitution ==
In 1783 William Dewitt was re-elected to the Assembly but vacated the seat to serve as Sheriff. On November 30, 1784, Captain William Dewitt was elected Senator of South Carolina. By March 21, 1785, he was also elected Justice for Darlington County, he was also still a Senator. On August 13, 1785, Saint David’s Society (Academy) the prominent institution of education and philanthropy continued to flourish. William Dewitt was the vice-president. By 1788, he resigned his participation in the Saint David's (society) Academy.

Congress of the Confederation was established between 1781 and 1789. Dewitt served as a state delegate to ratify the Constitution.

== Later life ==
Senator William Dewitt continued to participate in local government. He passed laws and helped develop South Carolina building bridges, highways and roads. Under his tenure they also added ferries. In 1806, now 68 years old he continued serving the South Carolina Senate. Saint David's Academy continued to flourish. In 1804, notable Professor of Languages and Yale graduate Enoch Hanford taught at the institution and married William Dewitt's Daughter Margaret.

By the turn of the century, William Dewitt was recorded owning nearly 55 slaves but records also reveal him selling large tracts of land with thousands of acres. William Dewitt died at 75 years old on July 18, 1813, slightly after the death of his wife. He left a sizable fortune to his heirs. Dewitt's will recorded 9 remaining slaves which were 2 families. He gave them to his two daughters. Dorothea Dewitt inherited Harry and his family Henry, Jack, and Solomon. Harriett Dewitt Inherited Charles and his family Caesar, Cate, Isham, and Jeff.

His legacy continued: U.S. Senator Josiah J. Evans married his daughter Dorothea. His granddaughter Mary married the nephew of Brigadier General David Rogerson Williams and his other granddaughter married the first U.S. Consul to Greece Gregory Anthony Perdicaris. His Great Grand Children included Chief Justice of the South Carolina Supreme Court Henry McIver and Ion Hanford Perdicaris.

== Bibliography ==
- Gregg D.D., Alexander (1905). History of The Old Cheraws Containing An Account of Aborigines of Pedee (PDF). The State Company South Carolina.
