= Young J. Pope =

American judge

Young John Pope
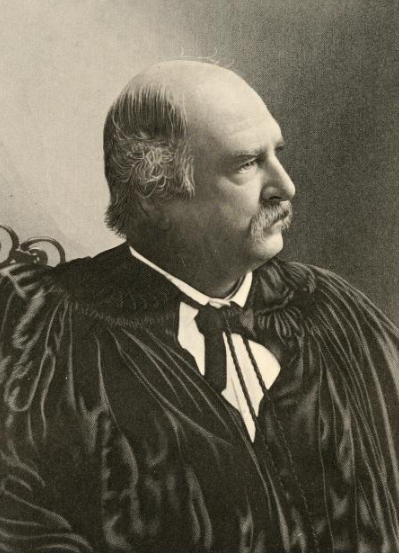

Chief Justice of South Carolina
- In office January 20, 1903 – January 6, 1909
- Preceded by: Henry McIver
- Succeeded by: Ira B. Jones

Associate Justice of South Carolina
- In office December 2, 1891 – January 20, 1903
- Preceded by: Henry McIver
- Succeeded by: Charles Albert Woods

Attorney General of South Carolina
- In office 1890–1891
- Governor: Benjamin Ryan Tillman
- Preceded by: office created
- Succeeded by: Charles H. Sheldon

Personal details
- Born: April 10, 1844 Newberry, South Carolina, US
- Died: March 29, 1911 (aged 66) Newberry, South Carolina, US
- Spouse: Sallie H. Rutherford
- Education: Furman University

Young John Pope (April 10, 1844 – March 29, 1911) was a South Carolina lawyer, mayor, attorney general, and chief justice on the South Carolina Supreme Court.

Pope graduated from Furman University in 1860. After graduation, he studied law under South Carolina Chief Justice John Belton O'Neal, but his studies were interrupted by the start of the Civil War, and he enlisted in the Confederate Army.

After the war, he continued his studies and was admitted to practice law in 1866. In 1874, he was elected mayor of Newberry and was re-elected once. In 1890, he was elected Attorney General of South Carolina.

He was serving in that role until December 2, 1891, when he was elected associate justice of the South Carolina Supreme Court. He was re-elected on January 30, 1896. On January 20, 1903, he became chief justice after the death of Chief Justice Henry McIver. On January 23, 1906, he was elected to a full eight-year term, but he resigned on January 6, 1909. He died on March 11, 1909.

== Time in the Civil War ==
After studying law under his uncle, Chief Justice O'Neall, he entered the Confederate Army on April 13, 1861, as First Sergeant in Company E, of Third South Carolina Regiment of Infantry. He participated in the battles of First Manassas and Williamsburg while in his company. In May, 1862, he was made Adjutant of the Third South Carolina Regiment, and as such participated in the battles of Savage Station, Malvern Hill, Maryland Heights, Sharpsburg, First Fredericksburg (where he was slightly wounded), Chancellorsville, Gettysburg (where he received three wounds), Chickamauga (where he was severely wounded), Wilderness, Brock's Road and other battles around Spottsylvania Court House, North Anna River Bridge, Second Cold Harbor, Berryville (where he was shot through the mouth), Strausburg, and Cedar Creek, on the 19th of October, 1864, where he lost his left eye, which was totally destroyed by a Minnie ball. By the end of the war, he had been wounded a total of 7 times.

During a part of the year 1864 Adjutant Pope served on the brigade staff as Assistant Adjutant General and was acting in this capacity when he received the wound that incapacitated him from further service in the field.
