= William Dunlap Simpson =

American judge (1823–1890)

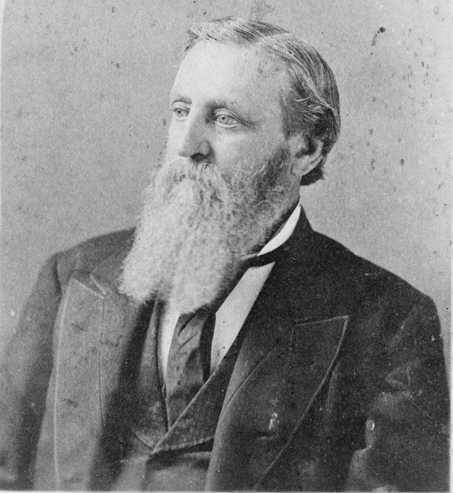

Chief Justice of the South Carolina Supreme Court
- In office September 6, 1880 – December 26, 1890
- Preceded by: Ammiel J. Willard
- Succeeded by: Henry McIver

78th Governor of South Carolina
- In office February 26, 1879 – September 1, 1880
- Lieutenant: None
- Preceded by: Wade Hampton III
- Succeeded by: Thomas Bothwell Jeter

56th Lieutenant Governor of South Carolina
- In office December 14, 1876 – February 26, 1879
- Governor: Wade Hampton III
- Preceded by: Richard Howell Gleaves
- Succeeded by: John D. Kennedy

Member of the Confederate States House of Representatives from South Carolina's 4th district
- In office February 5, 1863 – March 18, 1865
- Preceded by: Milledge Luke Bonham
- Succeeded by: Position abolished

Member of the South Carolina Senate from Laurens District
- In office November 26, 1860 – February 5, 1863
- Preceded by: James Henderson Irby
- Succeeded by: Barney Smith Jones

Member of the South Carolina House of Representatives from Laurens District
- In office November 22, 1858 – November 26, 1860
- In office November 27, 1854 – November 24, 1856

Personal details
- Born: October 27, 1823 Laurens District, South Carolina, US
- Died: December 26, 1890 (aged 67) Columbia, South Carolina, US
- Party: Democratic
- Spouse: Jane Elizabeth Young
- Children: 7
- Education: South Carolina College; Harvard Law School
- Profession: Lawyer, politician

Military service
- Allegiance: Confederate States of America
- Branch/service: Confederate States Army
- Rank: lieutenant colonel
- Battles/wars: American Civil War

William Dunlap Simpson (October 27, 1823 – December 26, 1890) was the 78th governor of South Carolina from February 26, 1879, when the previous governor, Wade Hampton, resigned to take his seat in the U.S. Senate, until 1880. That year Simpson resigned to become Chief Justice of the South Carolina Supreme Court.

== Early life ==
Born in Laurens District, South Carolina, in 1823, he was educated at South Carolina College (later the University of South Carolina), completing his studies in 1843. He spent one term at Harvard Law School. He practiced law in Laurens with his partner (and father-in-law) Henry Clinton Young. As of 1860, Simpson owned 31 enslaved people at his properties in Laurens.

== Political career ==
He served in the South Carolina legislature in the 1850s and early 1860s, and in the Confederate States House of Representatives from 1863 to 1865.

After the Civil War, Simpson returned to practice law in Laurens until 1876, when he ran successfully for the post of lieutenant governor. That year Democrats regained control of the state legislature and the governorship. He was re-elected in 1878. Upon Wade Hampton resigning from the governorship to assume his US Senate seat (to which he was elected by the state legislature), Simpson was elevated to become the 78th governor of South Carolina.

== Service as Chief Justice ==
In 1880 he resigned after being appointed Chief Justice of the state Supreme Court. He served for ten years from 1880 until his death in 1890. He is buried at the Laurens City Cemetery.

== Legacy and honors ==
- The William Dunlap Simpson House was added to the National Register of Historic Places in 1974.

Political offices
Preceded by Richard Howell Gleaves	Lieutenant Governor of South Carolina; 1876–1879	Succeeded by John D. Kennedy
Preceded by Wade Hampton III	Governor of South Carolina; 1879–1880	Succeeded by Thomas Bothwell Jeter
