= Richard Scudder =

American journalist and publisher

Richard Betts Scudder (May 13, 1913 – July 11, 2012) was an American newspaper pioneer, newspaper publisher, journalist, and co-founder of the MediaNews Group, the second largest newspaper company in the United States. He served as MediaNews' chairman from 1985 until 2009.

Scudder is also considered an innovator and pioneer of newspaper recycling. He founded the Garden State Paper Company, which later became one of the world's largest newspaper recycling companies.

== Biography ==
Scudder was born to Edward Wallace Scudder and Katherine Hollifield Scudder, on May 13, 1913, in Newark, New Jersey.

Scudder graduated from the Loomis Chaffee School before attaining a bachelor's degree in Economics with honors from Princeton University in 1935. He enlisted in the U.S. Army during World War II and served within Operation Annie, an Allied German-language counter-propaganda radio station. Scudder earned the rank of Major and the Bronze Star. In 1944, he married Elizabeth Shibley. Scudder returned to New Jersey from Europe in 1946 and became reporter at the Boston Herald, followed by a journalist position for the Newark Evening News, which his grandfather had founded in 1883. He later became the paper's publisher from 1952 until its closure in 1972. By then, the Scudder family had already sold the paper to Media General, in 1970.

In 1983, Scudder partnered with William Dean Singleton to purchase the Gloucester County Times. The South Jersey daily newspaper, which had a daily circulation of approximately 26,000 at the time, would become the first newspaper of the duo's MediaNews Group. Scudder and Singleton, who had been friends before they became business partners, soon purchased other newspapers - four in California and four in Ohio, financed largely by Scudder. Today, MediaNews, a privately held company, owns such major papers as The Denver Post, The Detroit News, The Oakland Tribune, The San Jose Mercury News and The El Paso Times. Overall, MediaNews has 57 daily newspapers in 11 states with a combined circulation of 2.3 million, making it the nation's second-largest newspaper company after the Gannett Company. MediaNews' combined, nationwide circulation stands at 2.3 million, which are published by 57 daily newspapers nationwide. MediaNews also owns 122 nondaily newspapers in nine states. Scudder served as MediaNews' chairman from 1985 until 2009; since 2010 Singleton is the company's executive board chairman.

Scudder died at his home in the Navesink section of Middletown, New Jersey, on July 11, 2012, at the age of 99. His wife Elizabeth died at 84 in 2003. Scudder was survived by one son, three daughters, eight grandchildren, one great-grandchild, several grand-nieces and nephews, and a few cousins and close extended family members.

== Ancestry ==
Scudder was named for Richard Betts Scudder, an ancestor who fought in the French and Indian War. Another ancestor, Colonel Nathaniel Scudder, was one of two delegates from New Jersey who signed the Articles of Confederation.

In September 1883, Scudder's grandfather, Wallace M. Scudder, founded the former Newark Evening News. Scudder's father, Edward Wallace Scudder, operated the newspaper.

Eight generations of Scudders have graduated from Princeton University, starting with a member of the school's first class. According to its alumni department, the Scudders are Princeton's largest alumni family. A small sample includes U.S. Rep. John A. Scudder (1775), Rev. John Scudder M.D. (1811), Edward Wallace Scudder I (1841) Hon. George Drake Scudder (1876), Edward W. Scudder II (1903), Charles Damarin Scudder I (1907), Charles Damarin Scudder II (1935), and Charles Damarin Scudder III (1963), and brother Edward Wallace Scudder III (1935). Richard Scudder's son and multiple grand kids have attended Princeton University. Richard B. Scudder (1935), and Edward W. Scudder (1935), together made the gift for Scudder Plaza in honor of their father, Edward Wallace Scudder (1903).
