= Perdicaris affair =

1904 kidnapping

Perdicaris incident
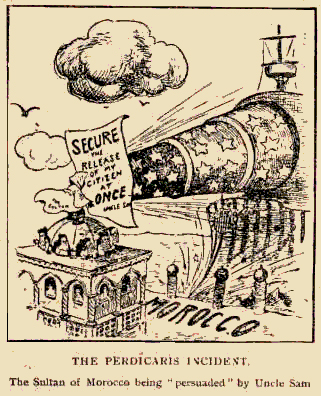
- US newspaper cartoon on the incident
- Date: 18 May – 21 June 1904
- Location: Tangier, Morocco
- Type: Kidnapping
- Motive: Payment of ransom
- Target: Ion Hanford Perdicaris; Cromwell Varley
- Organized by: Ahmed al-Raisuni
- Participants: 9-150 of Raisuni's men
- Charges: Payment by Abd al-Aziz: $70,000 to Ahmed al-Raisuni $4,000 to the United States

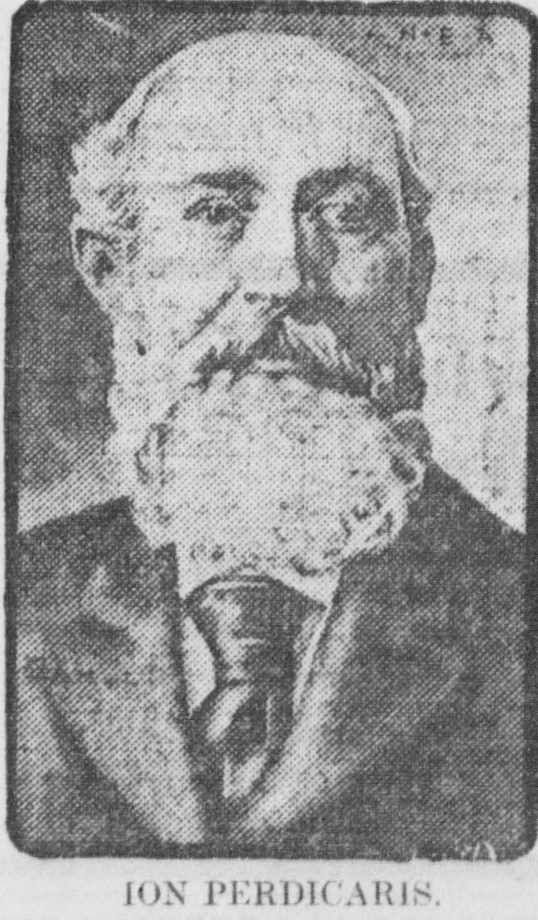
Ion Perdicaris, June 1904, Tacoma Times

The Perdicaris affair, also known as the Perdicaris incident, was the kidnapping of Greek-American Ion Hanford Perdicaris (Περδικάρης) (1840–1925) and his stepson, Cromwell Varley, a British subject, by Ahmed al-Raisuni and his bandits on 18 May 1904 in Tangier, Morocco. Raisuni, leader of several hill tribes, demanded a ransom of $70,000, safe conduct, and control of two of Morocco's wealthiest districts from the Sultan of Morocco Abd al-Aziz. During lengthy negotiations, he increased his demands to control of six districts. The historical importance of the affair lay not in the kidnapping itself but in the concentration of naval power in Tangier and what it meant for the politics of gunboat diplomacy.

Born in Greece in 1840 to the American ambassador and his wife, Perdicaris grew up mostly in New Jersey in the United States and was an American citizen. He had been living in Tangier since the 1870s. President Theodore Roosevelt felt obliged to react on his behalf in Morocco. Ultimately, he dispatched seven warships and several Marine companies to Tangier to convince the Sultan to accede to Raisuni's demands. Western European nations also reacted with force, with the United Kingdom, France, and Spain sending ships to prevent rioting in Morocco. John Hay, the American Secretary of State, issued a statement to the Republican National Convention in June 1904 that "This government wants Perdicaris alive or Raisuli dead."

Roosevelt's display of force in this incident is credited with helping the incumbent president win re-election later in 1904. After being released, Perdicaris moved with his family to England, settling in Tunbridge Wells.

== Background ==
Ion Perdicaris's father, Gregory Perdicaris, was sponsored in 1826 as a young Greek to study in the United States by the American Board of Commissioners for Foreign Missions. Perdicaris became a naturalized citizen of the United States and married the daughter of a wealthy family in South Carolina. In 1837, he returned to Greece, serving as the American ambassador. In 1840, his son Ion Perdicaris was born in Athens, Greece, while his father was serving as ambassador. The family returned to the United States in 1846, where the father at one time was a professor of Greek at Harvard University. The family settled in Trenton, New Jersey, where Gregory Perdicaris became wealthy as one of the organizers of the Trenton Gas Company.

For many years, Ion lived the life of a dilettante. He entered the Harvard University class of 1860 but left at the end of his sophomore year and studied at the Ecole des Beaux Arts in Paris for a time. In 1862, because of the American Civil War, the family's estate in South Carolina was in danger of confiscation by the government of the Confederate States of America. The younger Perdicaris, who was living in Athens, "registered" as a Greek subject in order to avoid confiscation or being drafted into the Confederate States Army.

After the war ended, Perdicaris lived in Trenton with his father. He published some articles in The Galaxy in 1868, before moving to England. There he studied electricity and related engineering. In 1871 in Malvern, England, Perdicaris met Ellen Varley, wife of the British telegraph engineer C.F. Varley. Varley was away on cable business. Ellen and Perdicaris began an affair that resulted in Ellen leaving her husband. The Varleys formally divorced in 1873 and Ellen married Perdicaris the same year.

The couple moved to Tangier around 1884, with Ellen's two sons and two daughters from her first marriage. She and her family were all British subjects. Perdicaris purchased a summer house there in 1877 known as Aidonia (Αηδόνια), or the "Place of Nightingales", as he collected a menagerie of exotic animals. Perdicardis dabbled in the arts and retained some ties to the US: In 1876, he exhibited a painting at the Centennial Exposition in Philadelphia. In 1879, Perdicardis produced a play at the Fifth Avenue Theatre in New York City, but it was unsuccessful. After 1884, he lived permanently in Tangier. He became the unofficial head of Tangier's foreign community. Serving as president of the Hygienic Commission in Tangier, he helped organize construction of a modern sanitation system for the city. The commission was said to act as the "chief foreign-controlled organization in Tangier, actually a government within a government". He also maintained business interests in England and the United States, frequently visiting New York.

In 1886, Perdicaris filed a complaint of misconduct against Felix Mathews, then the American Consul General in Morocco. Mathews had refused to prosecute a Moroccan for rape who was under American protégé status. Perdicaris also wrote and distributed a pamphlet entitled "American Claims and the Protection of Native Subjects in Morocco" in London in response to the issue. The government arrested and fined Perdicaris for shielding a Moroccan from arrest. (Later he sought and received redress for this). Through Perdicaris' crusading, the incident made national headlines in the United States, and Mathews was removed from his position in March 1887.

Ahmed al-Raisuni was a leader of three Jebala tribes near Tangier. He was influenced by the success of the 1901 Miss Stone Affair in Macedonia, when a group of missionaries were successfully held hostage for a ransom. In 1903, after five of his men were captured by the government, he held Walter Harris, a correspondent of The Times in Morocco, as hostage in exchange for the release of his men. After that success Raisuni targeted Ion Perdicaris for kidnapping.

== Kidnapping ==
Ion Perdicaris, his wife, and Cromwell Varley had moved to his summer home, Aidonia, from his house in Tangier on 16 May. Late on 18 May 1904, Perdicaris and Varley were abducted from their summer home by Ahmed al-Raisuni and a group of bandits (estimates of their number range from nine to one-hundred and fifty). His men cut the telephone lines, knocked out several of Perdicaris's servants, and left Ellen at the house. She later was able to contact the embassy, and at 11:00 pm, the American Consul General, Samuel Gummeré, arrived at the house.

The consul of Great Britain was also notified. On 19 May, a cable from Gummeré reached the United States. It read, in part:

Mr. Perdicaris, most prominent American citizen here, and his stepson Mr. Varley, British subject, were carried off last night from their country house, three miles from Tangier, by a numerous band of natives headed by Raisuly [sic]. . . I earnestly request that a man-of-war be sent at once. . . situation most serious.

As Raisuni's group traveled through the Rif Mountains, Perdicaris's horse fell and he broke his leg. Raisuni demanded of the Sultan of Morocco Abd al-Aziz a $55,000 ransom (later raised to $70,000); (Note: The money was to be raised by selling the property of his enemies.) removal of government troops from the region and an end to alleged harassment of the Riffian people; the removal, arrest, and imprisonment of the Pasha of Tangier and several other government officials; release of certain political prisoners; and cession of control of two of Morocco's wealthiest districts (later increased to six). Raisuni later added the stipulation that the United States and England must guarantee meeting these demands. Perdicaris was taken to a village on Mount Nazul, where tribes friendly to Raisuni lived.

=== American involvement ===
When the United States was notified of the kidnapping, the Secretary of State, John Hay, was out of town. The Assistant Secretary of State, Francis B. Loomis, dealt with the crisis. He diverted seven of the sixteen American ships in the Mediterranean Sea on a "goodwill cruise" to Tangier. Angered by the kidnapping, President Theodore Roosevelt reacted with a show of force.

Hay described the demands as "preposterous". The following day the United States ordered Admiral French Ensor Chadwick to dispatch a ship from the South Atlantic Squadron to Tangier. On 20 May, the British dispatched a torpedo boat from Gibraltar to the city. On 21 May, representatives from the sultan were sent to begin negotiations with the captors. By 25 May, negotiations had yet to achieve anything. On 29 May, Raisuni threatened to kill the prisoners if his demands were not met in two days. The incident revealed internal tensions, as the foreign minister of Morocco allied with Raisuni's enemies. The Sharifs of Wazan were credited with progress in the negotiations. That same day, Theodore Frelinghuysen Jewell was ordered to dispatch three additional ships. When a messenger from the Sultan arrived at Raisuni's camp, he was sold to the highest bidder, and was executed by having his throat slit.

The armored cruiser USS Brooklyn and cruiser USS Atlanta reached Tangier on 30 May, and Admiral Chadwick had a conference with the Sultan's representative. The next day, the gunboats USS Marietta and Castine arrived, and France assured the United States they would do "all in their power to rescue the prisoners". On 1 June the ransom demand was increased to $70,000. Jewell arrived with USS Olympia, Baltimore, and Cleveland, bringing the total American ships in Tangier to seven, manned by several Marine companies, commanded by Major John Twiggs Myers. At the time, the gathering was the most numerous of American ships in any foreign port.

They were not to be used without express orders from Washington, as it was thought that any action by the Marines would lead to the deaths of the prisoners. The United States planned to use them only to seize the custom-houses of Morocco, which supplied much of the nation's revenue, if the Moroccan government did not fulfill the demands of the United States. It insisted the government make the concessions necessary to persuade Raisuni to release Perdicaris, and to attack Raisuni if Perdicaris were killed. The only Marines to land in Morocco were a small detachment of four men, carrying only sidearms. They were ordered to protect the Consulate and Mrs. Perdicaris. Two other U.S. Marines were dispatched on 8 June to protect the Belgian legation.

On 30 May, A. H. Slocomb sent a letter to John Hay, claiming that Perdicaris was no longer an American citizen, having taken Greek citizenship. Though Roosevelt's resolve weakened, he decided to continue with the negotiations, as Raisuni believed that Perdicaris was an American citizen. Roosevelt tried to get Britain and France to join the U.S. in a combined military action to rescue Perdicaris, but the two countries refused. Instead, the two powers were covertly recruited to put pressure on the Sultan to accept Raisuni's demands. On 2 June the Italian cruiser Dogali arrived in port, and tensions rose to the point that there were fears of an uprising in the city.

=== Tensions escalate ===
On 6 June, the Spanish battleship Pelayo and Spanish ironclad Numancia arrived, due to fears that the United States might force Morocco to give them a port. In response to the request of the British minister in Morocco, HMS Prince of Wales left Gibraltar on 7 June. That same day, President Roosevelt received confirmation that Perdicaris had registered in Athens as a Greek citizen. Negotiations continued and on 8 May, the Sultan granted Raisuni's demands, appointing Herid el Barrada as governor of Tangier. Angry tribesmen raided the home of an Englishman. Negotiations dragged on. The government removed its troops from Raisuni's region on 9 June. On 14 June, an attempt was made to kidnap the Italian consul. On 15 June, Raisuni increased his demands to be given control of six, rather than two districts of Morocco.

On 19 June the Sultan accepted Raisuni's demands, with the date of release of captives set for 21 June. On 20 June, a hitch in negotiations occurred. Zelai, governor of an inland tribe, refused to act as intermediary. On 21 or 22 June the ransom money was deposited. On 22 June, Raisuni demanded another district for his control. Though a settlement had already been reached, a cable from Gummeré accused the Sultan of holding up negotiations.

Seeing the need to act, Hay issued a statement to the Republican National Convention, which was read by Joseph Gurney Cannon: "We want Perdicaris alive or Raisuni dead." While it was clear that the convention would nominate the incumbent Roosevelt as the Republican candidate, Hay's statement electrified the Convention. One Kansas delegate exclaimed, "Roosevelt and Hay know what they're doing. Our people like courage. We'll stand for anything those men do." After being nominated, Roosevelt easily won election in the fall of 1904. Perdicaris was home by 24 June, after most of Raisuni's demands were met.

Perdicaris wrote a narrative of his captivity while held by Raisuni. It was published in Leslie's Weekly, followed by National Geographic. After his release, Perdicaris admitted he was no longer an American citizen. While he had received Greek citizenship, he never lived in Athens for the required two years, and never renounced his American citizenship. The State Department concluded that Perdicaris had not "ever effectively acquired Greek, nor divested himself of American, citizenship." He was later issued a United States passport as an American citizen.

Despite the circumstances, Perdicaris came to admire and befriend Raisuni, who had pledged to protect his prisoner from any harm. Perdicaris later said: "I go so far as to say that I do not regret having been his prisoner for some time... He is not a bandit, not a murderer, but a patriot forced into acts of brigandage to save his native soil and his people from the yoke of tyranny." Several twenty-first century historians, such as Jeffrey D. Simon, suggested that Perdicaris displayed Stockholm syndrome in identifying with his captor.

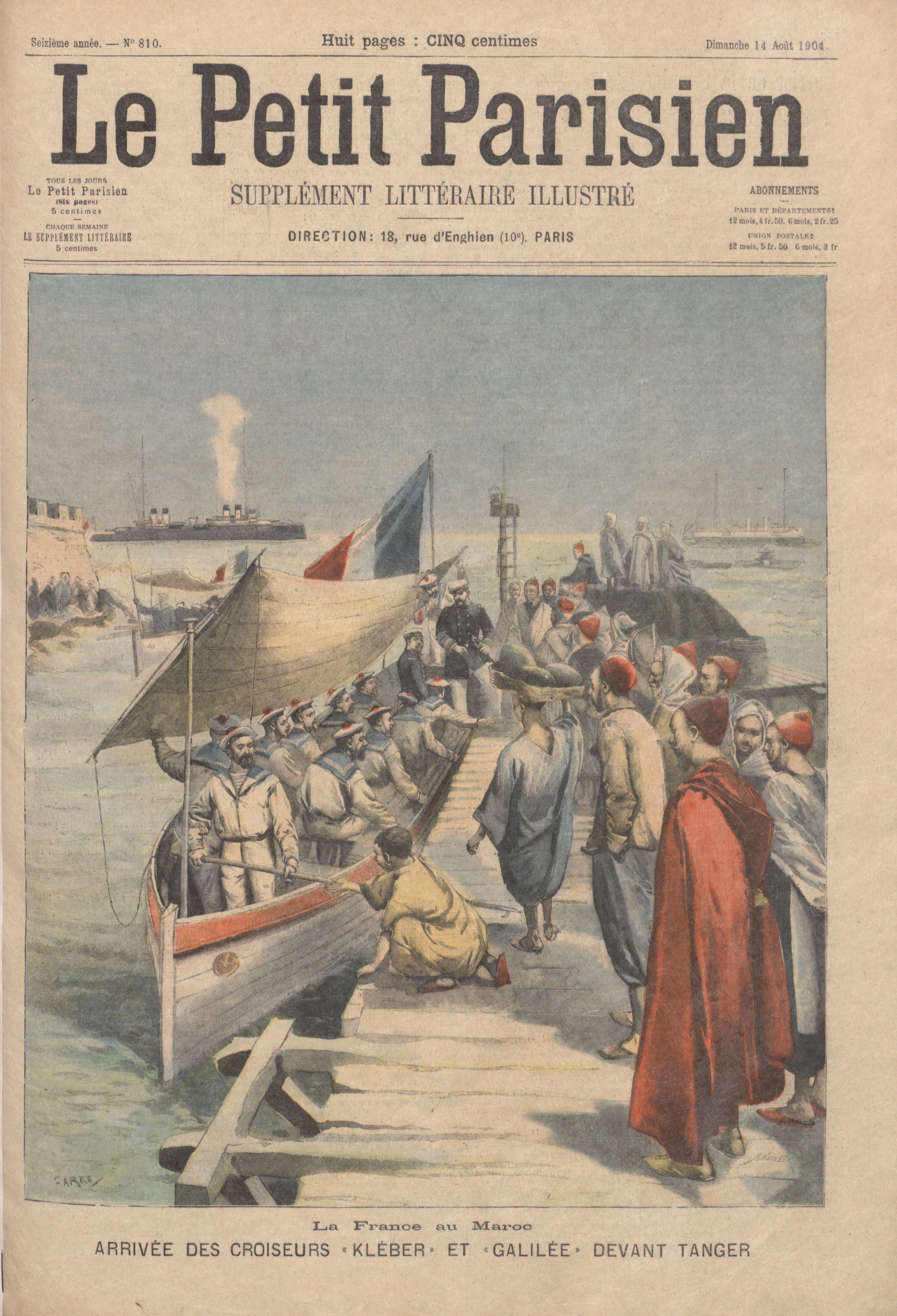
Le Petit Parisien illustrating the arrival of French cruisers Galilée and Kléber to Tangier

The Sultan of Morocco was required to pay the $70,000 ransom, and a further $4,000 to the United States to cover its expenses. Newspapers including The New York Times published editorials suggesting that France had to 'impose order' in the country. France intervened several times in Morocco's affairs in ensuing decades.

== Aftermath ==
Perdicaris and his family moved to England shortly after the incident, eventually settling in Tunbridge Wells. He occasionally returned to Trenton, where he maintained business interests. Perdicaris Place, off West State Street in Trenton, is named for him and his father. Ion Perdicaris died in London in 1925. Perdicaris published an autobiography in 1921, titled The Hand of Fate.

Raisuni used the money he gained from ransoming Perdicaris to build his palace, nick-named the "House of Tears".

The details of the incident (especially the fact that Perdicaris's U.S. citizenship was in doubt) were kept secret until 1933, when historian Tyler Dennett mentioned the crisis in his biography of John Hay. In 1975, Thomas H. Etzold described the kidnapping as "the most famous protection case in American history."

== Popular culture ==
"Hostages to Momus", a short story by the American author O. Henry, was inspired by the kidnapping of Ion Perdicaris. In the story, the character "Burdick Harris," a Greek citizen, stands for him. ("Bur-dick-Harris" is a play on "Per-dic-aris", as the names rhyme, if pronounced as the author intended). The humorous story was written shortly after the incident.

The story of Ion Perdicaris's kidnapping was loosely adapted to film in the 1975 motion picture The Wind and the Lion, with Sean Connery in the role of Raisuni and Brian Keith as Roosevelt. However, to add some glamour to the tale, the 64-year-old bearded hostage was replaced with attractive young "Eden Pedecaris", played by Candice Bergen. The film incorrectly showed US Marines invading Morocco and battling soldiers of the German Empire (who were not present in Morocco at the time), but it succeeded in presenting the personality of Raisuni and his interaction with his prisoners.

== See also ==
- Perdicaris Park
- Stockholm syndrome
- List of kidnappings
- Tangier International Zone
- American Legation, Tangier
- Moroccan seizure of the Betsey

== Bibliography ==
- Baepler, Paul (October 1999). "Rewriting the Barbary Captivity Narrative: The Perdicaris Affair and the Last Barbary Pirate". Prospects: An Annual of American Cultural Studies. 24. Cambridge University Press: 177–211. doi:10.1017/S0361233300000338. ISSN 0361-2333. OCLC 4796451456.
- Davis, Harold E. (December 1941). "The Citizenship of John Perdicaris". The Journal of Modern History. 13 (4): 517–526. doi:10.1086/236568. ISSN 0022-2801. OCLC 4642666978. S2CID 144264771.
- Etzold, Thomas H. (February 1975). "Protection or Politics? "Perdicaris Alive or Raisuli Dead"". Historian. 37 (2): 275–304. doi:10.1111/j.1540-6563.1975.tb00027.x. ISSN 0018-2370. OCLC 4649448900.
- Katz, Jonathan G. (2006). Murder in Marrakesh. Bloomington: Indiana University Press. ISBN 0253348153.
- Morris, Edmund (2001). "The Wire That Ran Around the World". Theodore Rex. New York: Random House. pp. 323–338. ISBN 0965406970.
- Simon, Jeffrey D. (2001). The Terrorist Trap. Bloomington: Indiana University Press. ISBN 978-0-253-21477-5.
- Tuchman, Barbara W. "Perdicaris Alive or Raisuli Dead." American Heritage, vol. 10, no. 5, Aug. 1959, pp. 18-21, 98-101. Reprinted in Tuchman, Practicing History - Selected Essays (1982)
- Walther, Karine (2015). Sacred Interests: The United States and the Islamic World 1821-1921. Chapel Hill: The University of North Carolina Press. ISBN 978-1-4696-2540-9.
