= Perdicaris Park =

Public park in Tangier, Morocco

Coordinates: 35.788°N 5.883°W

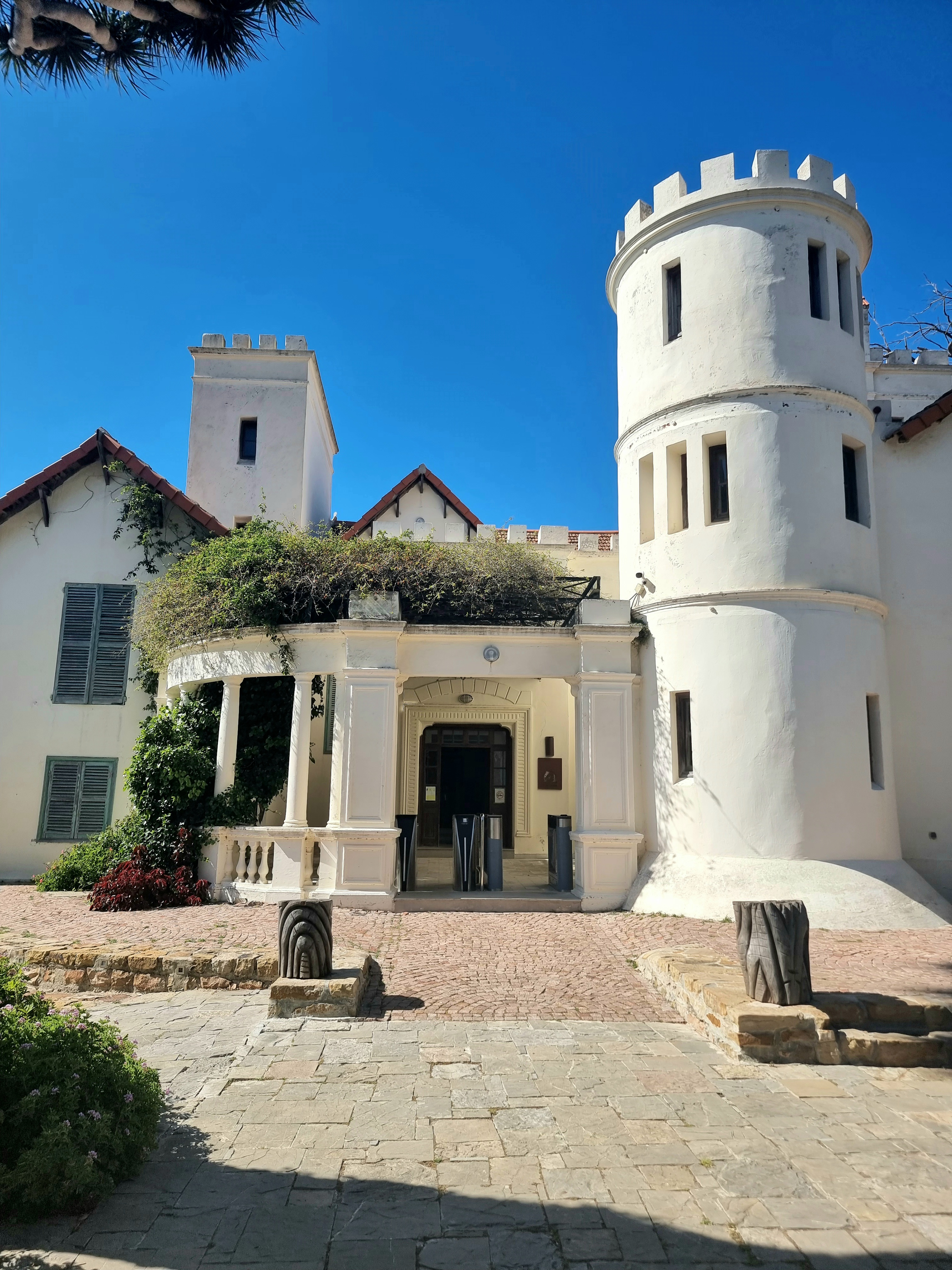
Perdicaris Villa, completely renovated in 2022

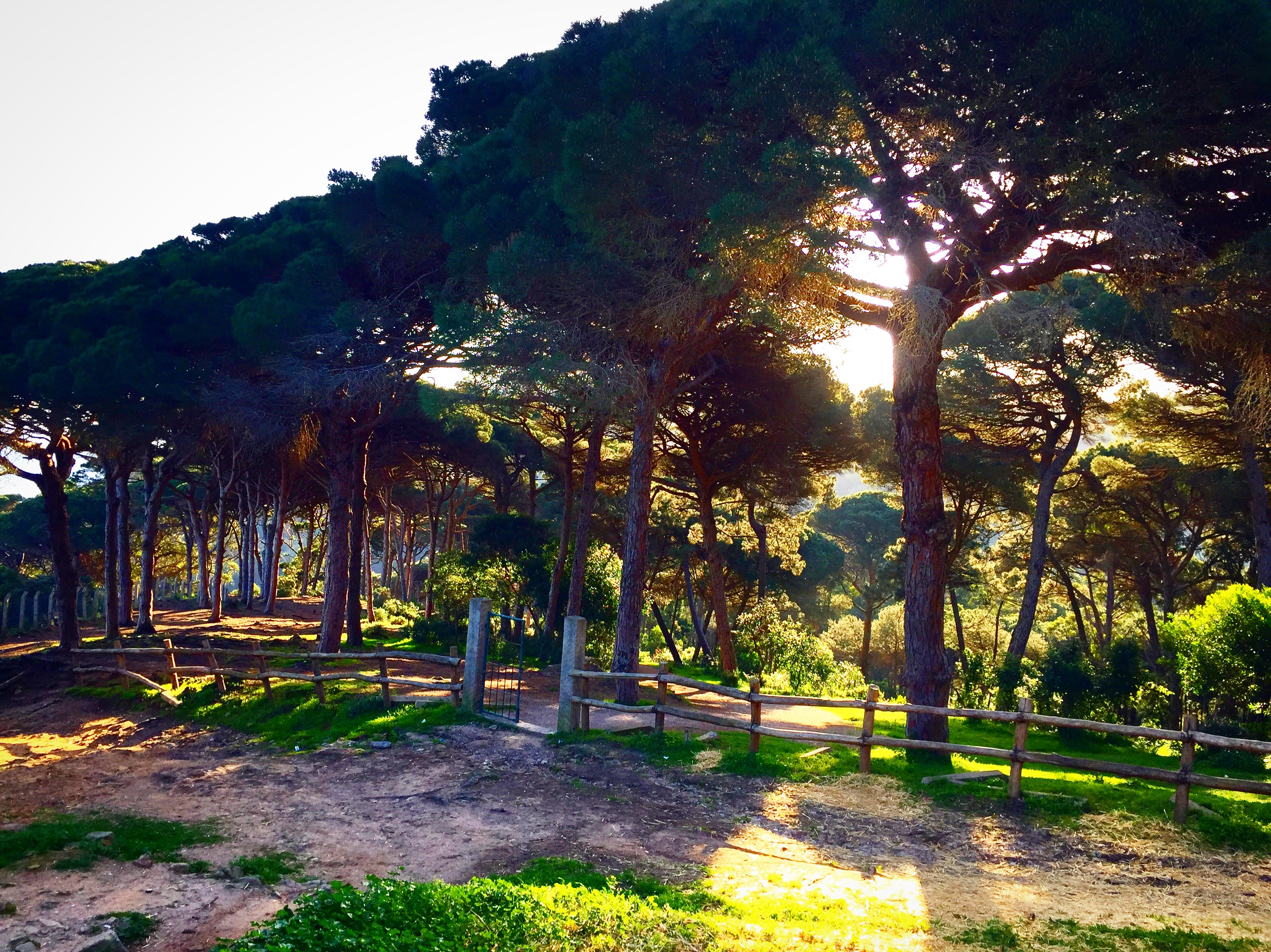
Sunrise in the Perdicaris Park

The Perdicaris Park, also known as the Rmilat Forest and formerly as Villa Aidonia or Place of the Nightingales, is a public park covering 70 hectares in the Rmilat neighborhood of Tangier, Morocco. It is located on the northern slopes of the Jebel Kebir hill facing the Strait of Gibraltar, between the Cape Spartel reserve to its west and the Jebel Kebir Royal Palace to its east. It is named after Greek-American notable Ion Hanford Perdicaris, who created it in the 1870s and was kidnapped there in the mid-1904 Perdicaris Incident.

== History ==
Ion Perdicaris purchased the property, hitherto known as Aidonia or Idonia, in the 1870s and erected an eclectic villa in its midst, also known as "Château Perdicaris".

In 1930, the Perdicaris family sold it to Marrakesh-based strongman Thami El Glaoui, who used it as his residence when visiting Tangier.

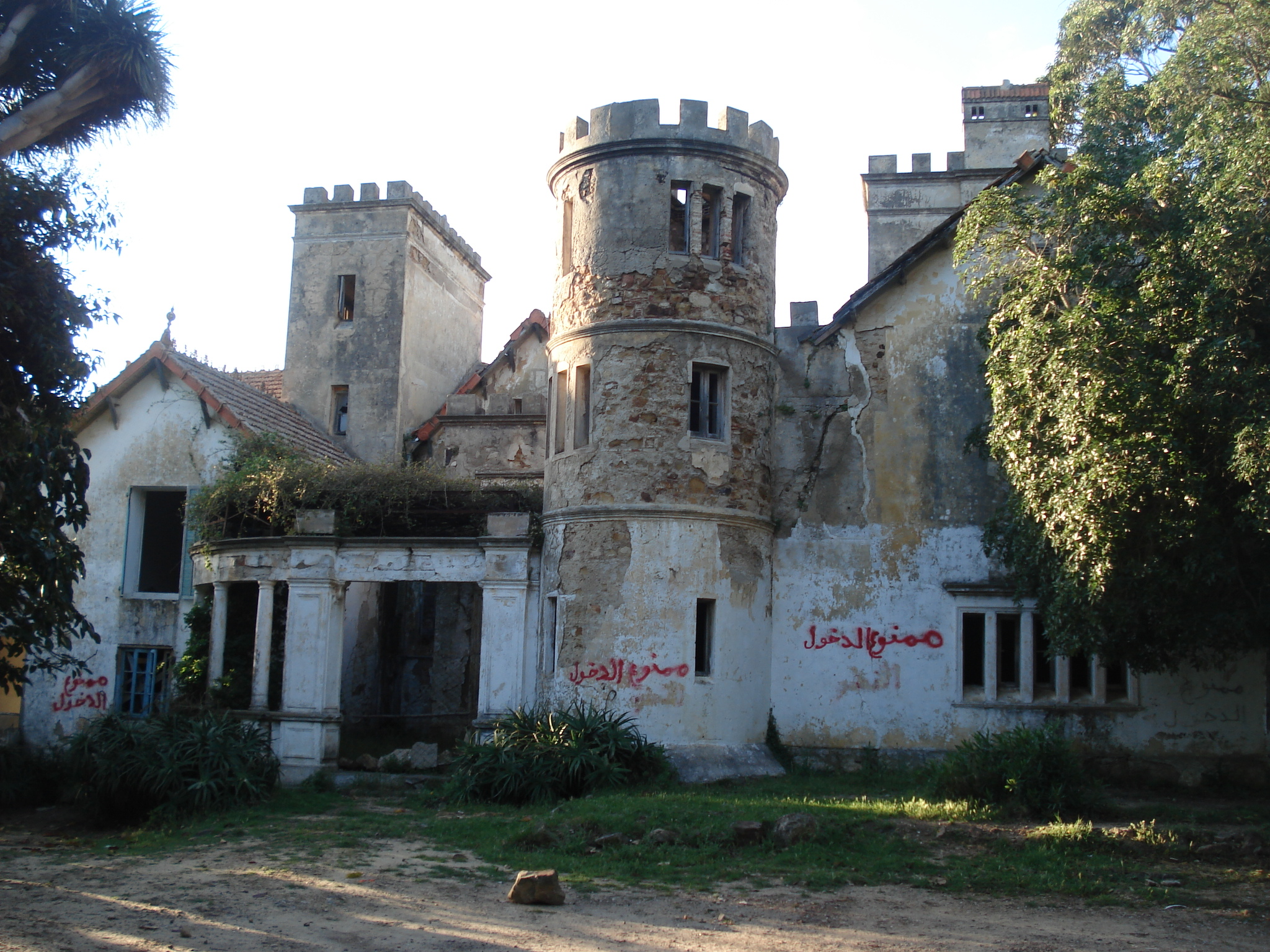
Perdicaris Villa in 2018, before renovation

After the death of El Glaoui followed by the independence of Morocco in 1956, the park became a state property. Following a period of neglect, renovation started in 2015. The villa was repurposed as a heritage center, inaugurated in early 2022.

The park is home to hundreds of different botanical species.

== See also ==
- Perdicaris affair
- Cape Spartel
