= Samuel R. Gummeré =

American lawyer and diplomat

Samuel Rene Gummeré (/ɡʌˈmɛər/; 1849 – May 28, 1920) was an American lawyer and diplomat who served as US Consul-General in Tangier, Morocco from 1898–1905, and Ambassador to Morocco from 1905–09, and became well known for his roles in the Perdicaris incident of 1904 and the Algeciras Conference two years later.

== Biography ==
Born in Trenton, New Jersey, Gummeré ran a law practice for several years. He traveled Europe extensively during the 1880s and became interested in politics. In 1898, having served in minor diplomatic posts, he was appointed Counsel-General in Tangier by President William McKinley and was later made Ambassador. He was considered a "diplomat of polish and ability, and a brilliant conversationalist and raconteur." A brother, William Stryker Gummere, served as chief justice of the Supreme Court of New Jersey.

Gummeré became an important player in the Perdicaris incident, in which Berber chieftain Mulai Ahmed er Raisuli kidnapped American expatriates Ion Perdicaris and his stepson, Cromwell Varley. Gummeré, a personal friend and former business partner of Perdicaris, initially advocated military action, but President Theodore Roosevelt and Secretary of State John Hay were more cautious, arguing that the situation in Morocco — which was maintaining a precarious independence due to the intrigues of foreign powers such as France, Britain, Germany, and Spain — made military action impractical. Gummeré met with the Ambassadors of France and Britain, and they agreed to help pressure the Sultan to meet Raisuli's demands. Raisuli agreed to release his hostage, but after this Hay sent Gummeré the famous telegraph which read: "Perdicaris Alive or Raisuli Dead!" largely as a matter of saving face. Gummeré later found out that Perdicaris was not in fact an American citizen (having become a naturalized citizen of Greece during 1862) and angrily demanded an explanation, leading to a falling out between the former friends.

Gummeré was appointed as the first US Minister to Morocco as a reward for his service in resolving the crisis. Later, he served as one of the American mediators, under Ambassador to Italy Henry White, in the Algeciras Conference of 1906, which helped resolve European tensions over Morocco. The conference called for the organization of a State Bank for Morocco and the organization of a Moroccan native police force — albeit under European supervision. While the Europeans backed this plan, Moroccan Sultan Abdelaziz was initially reluctant, finally agreeing to sign it on June 18. The conference also rebuked French attempts to establish Morocco as a protectorate; but ultimately, French control of Morocco was only staved off for six years.

After 1909 Gummeré retired from public life, dying eleven years later.

In the heavily fictionalized film The Wind and the Lion (1975), which deals with the Perdicaris incident, he was portrayed by Geoffrey Lewis.

== Awards and honors ==
Gummeré was awarded an honorary degree from Brown University in 1865.

== Notes ==
Preceded by Nonexistent	Head of US Legation in Tangier; 1906–1909	Succeeded by Henry Percival Dodge
