= William Lewis Dayton Jr. =

American diplomat

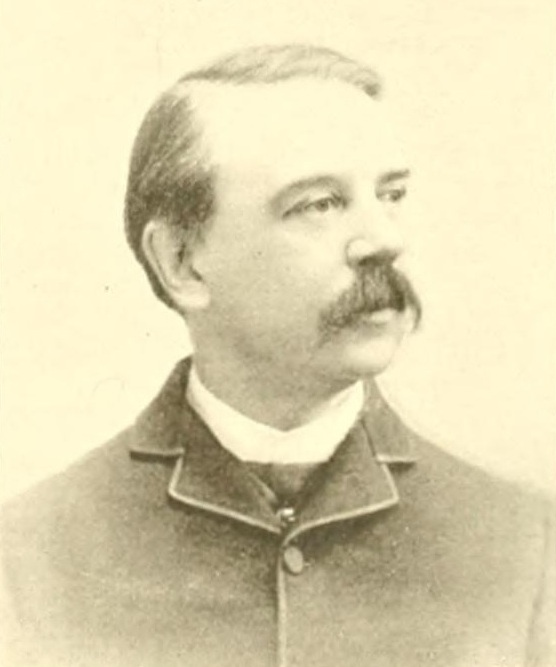
William L. Dayton Jr., U.S. Ambassador to the Netherlands

William Lewis Dayton Jr. (April 13, 1839 – July 28, 1897) was an American lawyer, judge and diplomat who served as U.S. Minister to the Netherlands. He was the son of William L. Dayton.

== Biography ==
William Lewis Dayton Jr. was born in Princeton, New Jersey on April 13, 1839. He graduated from Princeton University in 1858, studied law and became an attorney.

A Republican, from 1861 to 1865 he served as a Secretary at the U.S. Embassy in Paris when his father was U.S. Ambassador to France. From 1865 to 1868 he served as Secretary to Governor Marcus Lawrence Ward.

The younger Dayton was elected to the Trenton City Council in 1876 and served as Council President from 1876 to 1877. From 1879 to 1881 he was Trenton's City Solicitor.

In 1882 Dayton was appointed Minister to the Netherlands, serving until 1885. He served again as Trenton City Solicitor from 1889 to 1891. He was appointed a Judge of the New Jersey Court of Appeals in 1896 and served until his death.

Dayton was a founder of Mercer Hospital, Counsel and a board of directors member for the Trenton Banking Company, a member of the Trenton Battle Monument Association, manager of the Trenton Saving Fund Society, and President of the Board of Trustees of Trenton's First Presbyterian Church.

Dayton died in Trenton on July 28, 1897.

William L. Dayton Jr. was married to Harriet Maria Stockton, the daughter of Robert F. Stockton and niece of John P. Stockton.

Diplomatic posts
Preceded by James Birney	U.S. Minister to the Netherlands; 1882–1885	Succeeded by Isaac Bell Jr.
