= Ion Hanford Perdicaris =

American statesman (1840-1925)

- Ίων Χάνφορντ Περδικάρης
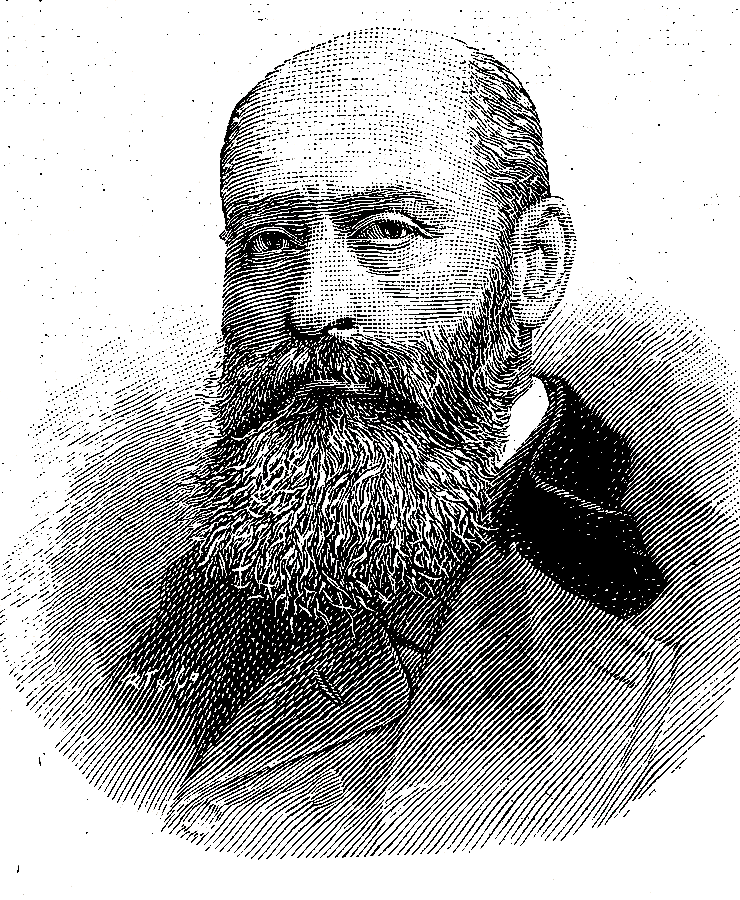
- Portrait of Ion
- Born: April 1, 1840; Athens, Greece
- Died: May 31, 1925 (aged 85); London, England
- Resting place: Saint Nicholas Church Yard Chislehurst
- Education: Harvard University (dropped out)
- Known for: Portrait of Ellen Varley
- Notable work: Resurgamus
- Movement: American Art
- Spouse: Ellen Varley nee Rous

Personal details
- Profession: Writer, painter, diplomat, and activist
- Known for: International diplomacy, Moroccan studies

Ion Hanford Perdicaris (April 1, 1840 – May 31, 1925) was an American author, professor, lawyer, painter, and playwright. He was a humanitarian and human rights activist. He fought for the rights of Moors, Arabs, and slaves. He was active in the anti-slave movement in the United States and abroad namely in Morocco. Ion fought to change the Protégé system in Morocco. Ion became an international celebrity because of the Perdicaris affair.

Born in Athens, Greece, he grew up in Trenton, New Jersey. He briefly attended Harvard University before traveling to Europe to attend school. He fled the United States during the American Civil War due to his ties to South Carolina and his mother's prominent family. Perdicaris renounced his American citizenship and tried to become a Greek citizen in an unsuccessful effort to avoid the confiscation of the Charleston Gas Light Company.

Ion traveled back and forth to London from the United States. He became an international correspondent for The Galaxy magazine. He was a young playboy living a lavish style and attending seances. In 1872 he married Ellen, the wife of C. F. Varley. By the 1880s, Ion and his parents moved to Morocco in a mansion they built at the Place of Nightingales. There Ion became active in the international community and fought for the rights of the local Moorish population, writing several essays and a book advocating their rights.

In May 1904, Ion was kidnapped by Mulai Ahmed er Raisuni. His bandits raided Ion's mansion and brought him up to the mountains along with his stepson Cromwell Varley. Theodore Roosevelt's response to what became known as the Perdicaris affair drew wide attention. Ion briefly returned to the United States and finally lived out the rest of his life in a mansion in Chislehurst, England. Ion and Helen Varley were buried at Saint Nicholas Church Yard Chislehurst.

== Early life ==
Ion Hanford Perdicaris was born in Athens, Greece, while his father Gregory Anthony Perdicaris was United States Consul to Greece. His father had migrated to the United States in the late 1820s from Greece. Ion's mother was the granddaughter of United States Revolutionary War hero Captain William Dewitt. She was a member of a wealthy family of planters from Cheraw, South Carolina. Some of the members included: U.S. Senator Josiah J. Evans, a great uncle, and South Carolina Supreme Court Justice Henry McIver, a first cousin.

Ion's family moved back to the United States in 1845. They resided at the Perdicaris Ashley Cottage, an elaborate twenty-room estate on the north side of Trenton, New Jersey. Ion grew up in Trenton and attended the Trenton Academy. His father was one of the Trustees and the school was controlled by Trenton's elite families. Most of the students were the children of America's leadership and the wealthy elite class. His father became a prominent entrepreneur and was involved in local politics. By the age of ten Ion was involved in the family business but chose painting instead of business. According to an account from one of Ion's classmates, his lavish paintings adorned the mansion. Ion's father Gregory amassed a small fortune. According to the United States Census of 1860, the Perdicaris estate was worth roughly 6 million dollars adjusted for 2019 inflation.

== American Civil War ==
Perdicaris graduated from Trenton Academy in 1855. He wrote an essay titled Unity of Beauty that was presented at the school's commencement ceremony in July 1855. Ion enrolled in Harvard University the following year. He also exhibited his painting Cattle at the Thirty-Third Annual Exhibition of the Pennsylvania Academy of the Fine Arts. Ion was no longer a student at Harvard in the spring of 1858. He traveled to England that summer to study painting.

Ion was urged by members of his family who supported the Confederate States of America to assist on their side in the American Civil War. His father was crucial because he was a former diplomat and had ties to many different countries in Europe, most notably the King and Queen of Greece. There were over 18 different countries represented with over 50 different consuls in the diplomatic community when Gregory was in Greece. The information was relayed to the McIver family, led by Henry McIver; the family were Perdicaris's cousins and prominent supporters of the Confederacy.

The McIver family confiscated the Perdicaris family's estate and personal belongings in South Carolina, naming them alien enemies. The confiscation occurred one month after the onset of the American Civil War and three months before the official Confederate Sequestration Act. The McIvers refused to hire a substitute for their cousin who was studying in Europe. They chose to confiscate their assets. One year later, the confederacy confiscated 1351 shares of the Charleston Gas Light Company, worth close to one million dollars, adjusted for 2019 inflation. The shares belonged to Gregory.

The issue led to the Supreme Court case Dewing v. Perdicaris, 96 U.S. 193 (1877). According to a letter Perdicaris sent to Samuel R. Gummeré, he was instructed by his parents to obtain Greek citizenship to stop the sequestration. They found expatriation a legal solution. Expatriation was not legally permitted until the Expatriation Act of 1868. Records indicate Perdicaris submitted his paperwork twenty-three days before the South sequestered close to one million dollars' worth of stocks. By law, he was still an American citizen. Gummeré's father was business partners with the Perdicaris family.

== London ==
Ion was raised in a diplomatic household. His father was the first American Consul to Greece Gregory Anthony Perdicaris. By the 1860s he was a lawyer living in London and traveling the world. He began to affiliate himself with the diplomatic community. His parents Gregory and Margret were reported departing Liverpool England, August 28, 1863. In December 1864, Ion was in Florence, Italy with the diplomatic community watching a theater play.

From a young age, Perdicaris showed an interest in writing. His father was affiliated with Edgar Allan Poe. He published several articles in The Galaxy, a New York City based magazine. Ion's first article was about painting it was entitled English and French Painting. One year later he wrote another two articles for the magazine, one was called Reminiscences of a Parisian Atélier and the other The Exhibition of the Royal Academy. One was published in March and the other July 1867. Another article was published in 1868 called Art and Modern Inventions. All four articles were related to art, art history and painting.

Perdicaris lived at two addresses during this period in London. Records indicate he lived at Gloucester Crescent, Camden and the Heathcote-villas St Margarets, London. He was also interested in the subject of spiritualism and séances. Prominent engineer and early developer of the electric telegraph and the transatlantic telegraph cable Cromwell Fleetwood Varley and his wife Ellen Varley also took interest in the claims of parapsychology and spiritualism and attended séances with Ion and other wealthy figures. In 1872, Ion married Ellen Varley.

== Return to Trenton, New Jersey ==
Ion returned to the United States in the later part of 1874 married to Ellen Varley. She was a thirty-seven-year-old woman with four children from another marriage and was three years older than her new husband. The children's names were Ada, Cromwell Oliver, Hebe, and Fleetwood E. Varley. The children were recorded attending the State Normal School of New Jersey for the year 1875–76. Ion presented his painting called Moorish Interior to the Centennial International Exhibition of 1876. The exposition began May 10 and ended Nov 10. Ion, Ellen, and the children were recorded traveling on a steamer from Southampton to Gibraltar on July 20, 1876. They were traveling to Morocco. The next year local Trenton newspapers recorded Ion freeing a slave in Morocco with the help of the United States Government. While Ion lived in London he was searching for a location to build a summer home on the Mediterranean Sea. He choose Morocco because of a conversation he had with a retired French Naval officer on his way back to Liverpool from New York. The officer invited Ion and his wife to the region. Ion built two houses in Morocco.

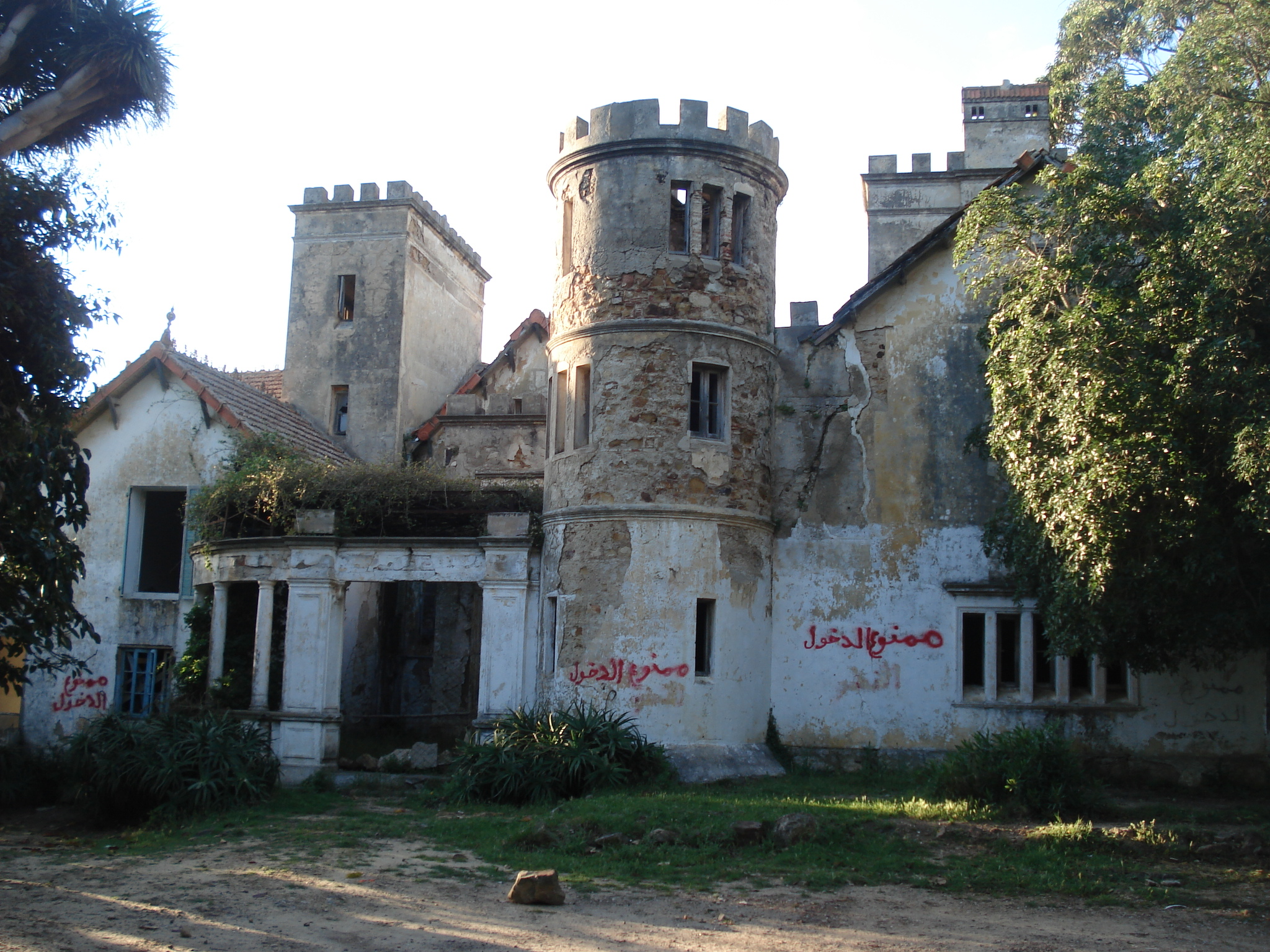
Aidonia

They began to build the historical castle mansion known as Idonia or Aidonia (Αηδόνια; "[Place of the] Nightingales") in Morocco in the 1870s. The second home in Morocco was the city home called El Minzah. Ion returned to the United States with the family to put on a play on Broadway for his daughter Eleanor Ada Varley she adopted the stage name Nard Almayne. By 1880, she married an actor named Nelson Decker. Both became well-known stage actors on Broadway in New York City. Two plays appeared in New York City in 1879 produced by Ion. The first play was called La Societaire, Townsend Percy was the cowriter the second play was called The Picture. The Picture featured a massive painting created by Ion called Resurgamus (Combat of Life, Terror of Death and Triumph of Immortality) it was 16 feet x 23 feet or 4.9 meters x 7 meters.

== Morocco ==
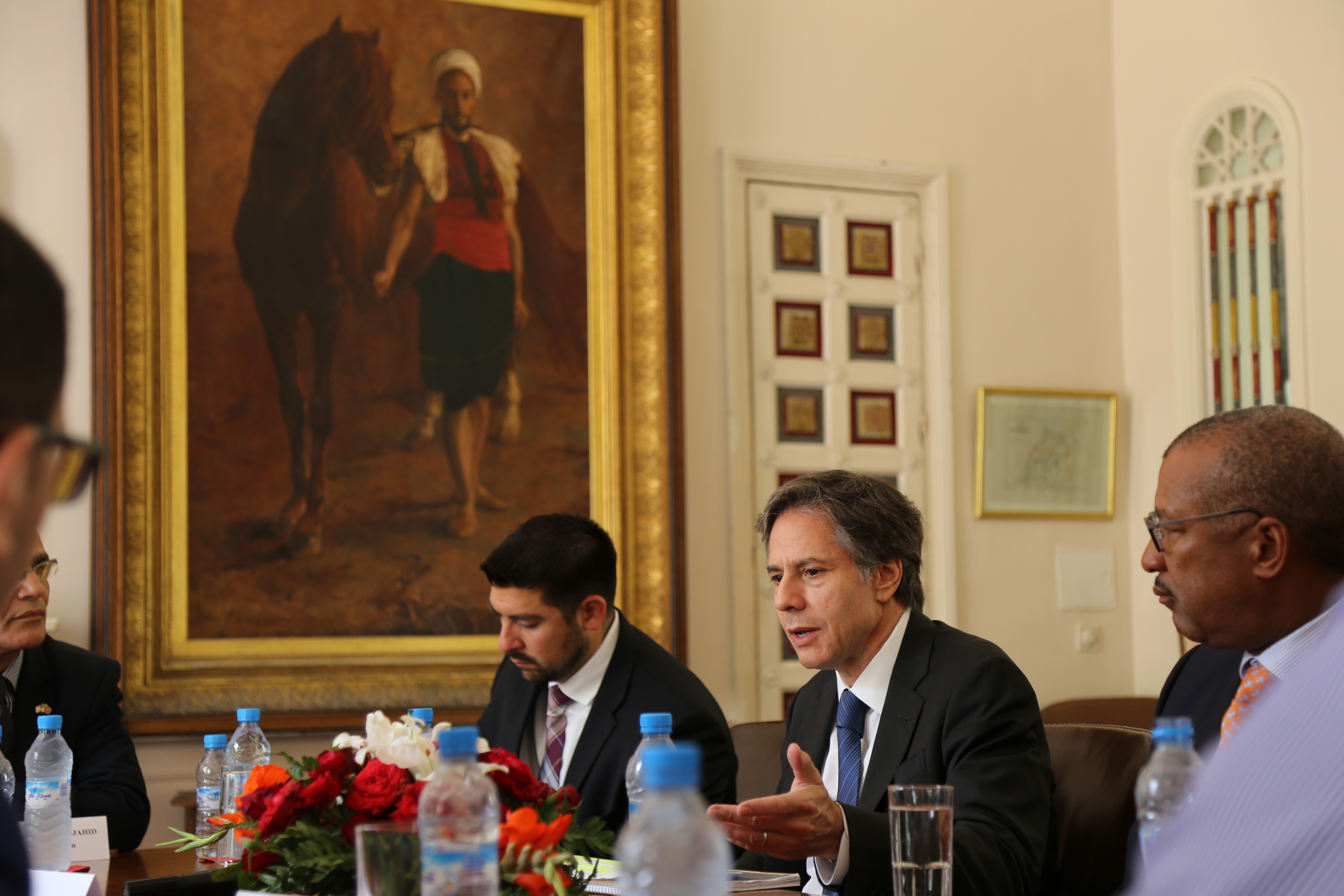
Man with Horse Painted By Ion Perdicaris

Both Perdicaris's parents left Trenton to join their son in Morocco. His father died in Morocco in 1883, and his mother died two years later. Ion hosted lavish parties at his massive estate. He was heavily involved in diplomatic affairs in the region. His second stepdaughter Hebe Varley married the dragoman of the Italian embassy in Morocco. His name was Gianatelli Gentile cav[aliere] Agesilao.

Ion convinced the Sultan to create the Tangier Hygienic Commission. Around the same period, the practice of arresting debtors in Morocco was a harsh tactic allowed by local laws and customs. Perdicaris was an advocate for the poor and destitute Moors and Arabs that could not repay certain debts and were harshly imprisoned. Wealthy lenders used the protégé system to control and abuse the local population namely the Moors. Around this period he published a few essays and a book addressing the Treaty of Madrid. He wrote a pamphlet called American Claims in Morocco and a novel entitled The Case of Mohammed Benani. Around this time Ion was also interviewed by a reporter from the Pall Mall Gazette on May 30, 1887. The name of the interview was The European Vampire in Morocco. The interview also addressed the harsh treatment of the Moors and the protégé system.

In 1886, he was briefly arrested by order of the American Consul Felix A. Mathews because Ion brought a formal investigation against the public official. After a year Ion influenced the replacement of Mathews. On March 18, 1887, during the arrival of his replacement, William Reed Lewis, a celebration was held at the Perdicaris estate. The natives thanked Ion for assisting their release from prison. The event was again publicized by the American media. In 1890, Lewis was removed from office because he was using the office of consul to arrest local citizens for his own personal gain.

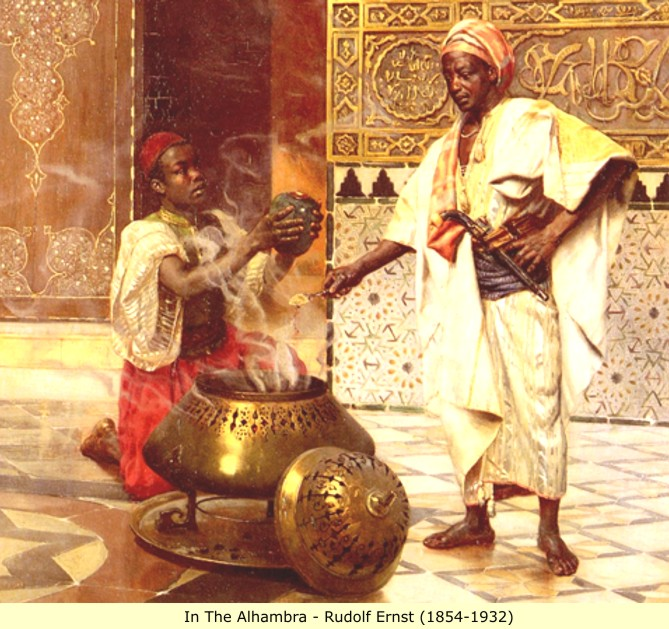
The Moorish People

His wife Ellen was the president of the chief charitable association of Tangier named Las Damas de Caridad de Tanger. Ion was the vice-president of the Tangier Hygienic Commission. In 1887, Ion advocated a special status for Tangier as a neutral free port under the great powers' joint control. In 1893, the Commission's role was broadened to public roads, with authority to raise levies.

Both Ellen and Ion were committed to the poor and destitute. Ellen ran a soup kitchen for the needy. Every Wednesday Ion and his wife hosted lavish dinners and balls for the local elite community. Towards the end of the century, he continued writing he finished two essays, Currency and The Condition of Morocco.

By the late 1890s, wealthy elite Trentonian Samuel R. Gummeré was in Morocco visiting Ion. He spent three winter seasons with Ion. Gummeré became the U.S. Consul to Morocco.

== Perdicaris affair ==
The Perdicaris mansion at the Place of the Nightingale was raided by 90-200 bandits on May 18, 1904. Ion and his stepson Cromwell Varley were kidnapped by Mulai Ahmed er Raisuni and brought to the mountains. Ion broke his leg during the ordeal. U.S. Consul Samuel R. Gummere alerted the U.S. government about the incident. Ion was in the mountains for several weeks. Ion and the kidnapper became very good friends and the incident is regarded as an example of Stockholm syndrome. Due to his political background and wealth, by May 30, America sent the South Atlantic Squadron of the United States Navy to Morocco.

The incident was overblown in the media because Theodore Roosevelt needed the publicity for his re-election campaign. The slogan Perdicaris Alive or Raisuli Dead became well known. Ion returned to the United States as an international figure around June 24, 1904. This is the fourth instance where Perdicaris involved the U.S. government. In the first instance, he freed a slave in Morocco with the aid of the U.S. Consul. The incident was publicized in Italy and Trenton, New Jersey. He indirectly overthrew two U.S. Consuls, Felix A. Mathews and William Reed Lewis because of his problem with the Protégé system. The final major incident occurred when his close family friend and U.S. Consul Samuel Gummere surrounded the entire country of Morocco with the South Atlantic Squadron of the United States Navy.

== Return to the United States ==
Ion wrote articles about the Moors and the oppressive wealthy elites that abused them. He was internationally known when he returned to the United States. The attention gave the educated scholar the opportunity to discuss Moroccan culture with the people of the United States. He wrote dozens of articles about Morocco for publications in the United States some included: The General Situation in Morocco. He traveled throughout the country lecturing about his ordeal. The American media capitalized on the situation. Perdicaris wrote a guide on fun games to play while being kidnapped entitled How to Enjoy Captivity with Raisul by His Former Captive Mr. Ion Perdicaris. It was published in: The Sketch: A Journal of Art and Actuality, Volume 59 in 1907.

Ion included the term negro in his description of the people of Morocco in an article he wrote for National Geographic entitled Morocco the Land of the Extreme West and the Story of my Captivity . He told his readers that there was no distinction between color in the region. He also explained that the elite Bokhari guards were recruited from the Sudan. During the period after the death of Hassan I of Morocco from 1894 to 1900, a regent ruled the land until Abdelaziz of Morocco was old enough to rule. He was referred to as a negro man named Ahmed bin Mūsa. Ion described him as one of the most competent rulers of Morocco. He also lectured for the National Geographic Society. Some members of the McIver family embraced Ion. The family that added South Carolina to the U.S. Constitution, removed South Carolina from the United States during the American Civil War, and defended Jim Crow laws now reconciled with Ion. Henry McIver's niece Helen Hanford McIver named her son Ion Perdicaris Gignilliat after Ion in 1910. The incident was added to the McIver family papers.

Ion maintained a massive fortune in the United States as the coal and gas companies his father created were evolving into electric companies. He also owned large tracts of land in Trenton, New Jersey. One of his properties was considered for the new city hall. The city of Trenton was offering $30,000, or $830,000 adjusted for 2022 inflation. Ion continued to lecture all over the country and travel the world. He specialized in international diplomacy and most of his papers were about Moroccan history, culture, and sociology, capitalizing on the media craze. He finally moved to England at seventy years old.

== London manor house and retirement ==
After 1910, Ion moved back to England where he purchased the manor house in Chislehurst, Kent, England. At seventy years, he continued to host diplomatic parties at his huge estate. His granddaughter Nellie Gianatelli Gentile married Colonel Serge de Likatscheff, the Secretary of the Russian Embassy. Cromwell Varley continued to live with his mother and stepfather. Ellen Varley died in 1920. Ion lived another five years and died in 1925. He was 85 years old. Both Ellen and Ion were buried at Saint Nicholas Church Yard in Chislehurst, London. He left a massive fortune close to 16.7 million dollars adjusted for 2022 inflation. He left his butler close to 500,000 adjusted for 2022 inflation.

== Notable residences ==
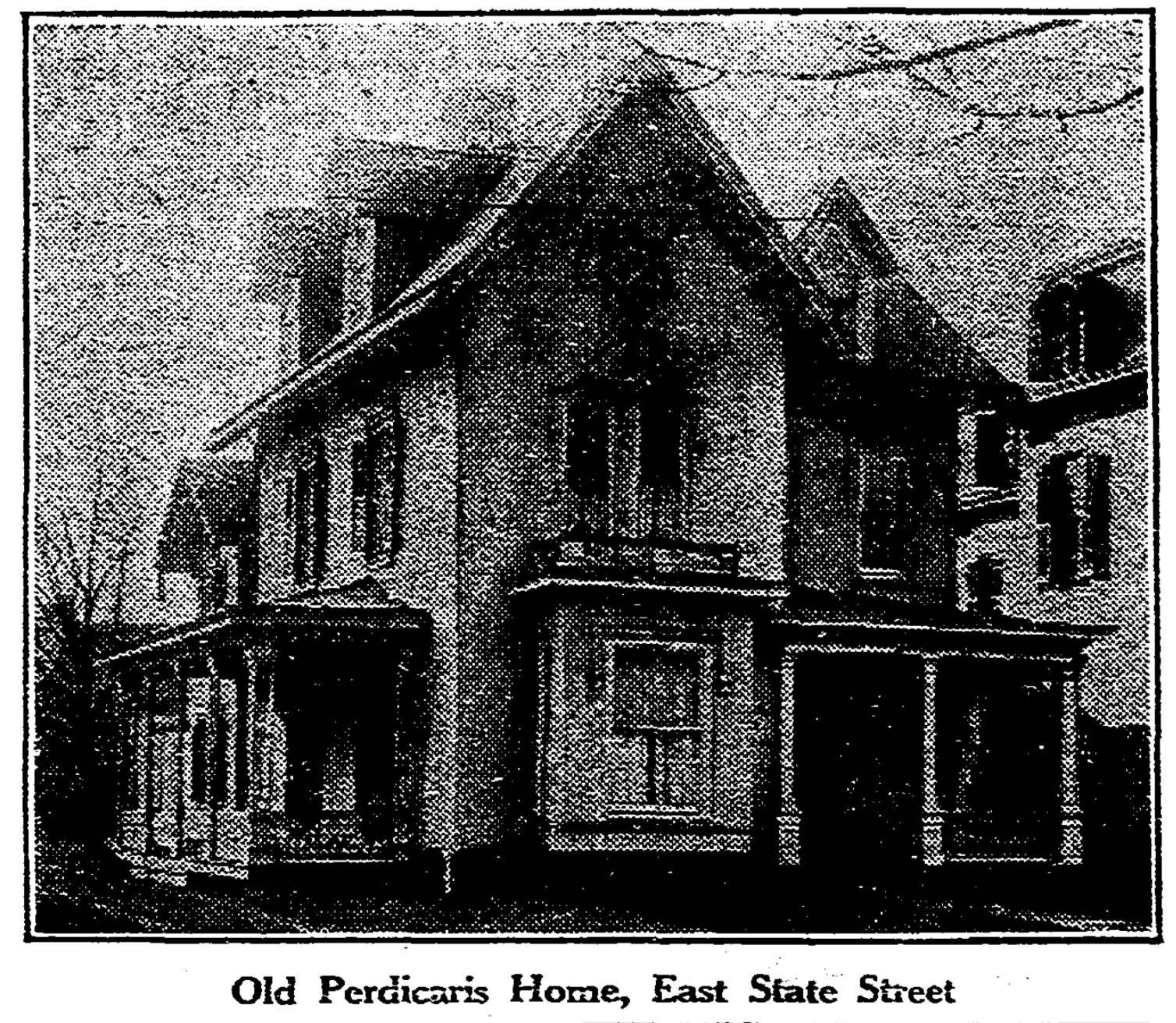
Perdicaris Ashley Cottage

Ion was raised in a lavish mansion in Trenton called the Perdicaris Ashley Cottage. He later built two homes in Morocco. When he returned to the United States he briefly stayed at the Ellarslie Mansion in Trenton. He sold the Perdicaris Ashley Cottage in 1895 to the Phillips family. He later moved to England. He occupied a massive house in Chislehurst. The home was called The Manor House. By 1913, he sold one of his two homes in Morocco. El Minzah sold for 80,000 dollars in 1913. He still owned The Place of the Nightingale, Idonia or Aidonia. By 1936, the family mansion the Perdicaris Ashley Cottage located at 531 East State Street was purchased by a wealthy elite developer named Morris R. Young. His Moroccan mansion El Minzah was turned into a hotel and around June 2018, the French language Moroccan newspaper Aujourd'hui le Maroc announced the Place of Nightingales would be restored with a budget of 10 million Moroccan dirham close to one million dollars.

== Artwork ==
- Composition (1855)
- Cattle (1856)
- Amalthea
- Moorish Interiors (1876)
- Resurgamus (Combat of Life, Terror of Death, and Triumph of Immortality) (1879)
- Portrait of Ellen Varley Perdicaris Room The American Legation Tangier, Morocco
- Man with Horse Perdicaris Room The American Legation Tangier, Morocco

== Literary works ==
=== Essays ===
- Unity of Beauty (Graduation Essay Trenton Academy 1855)
- English and French Painting (The Galaxy Volume 2 1866)
- Reminiscences of a Parisian Atélier (The Galaxy Volume 3 1867)
- The Exhibition of the Royal Academy (The Galaxy Volume 4 1867)
- Art and Modern Inventions (The Galaxy Volume 6 1868)
- American Claims and the Protection of Native Subjects in Morocco (Pamphlet 1886)
- Currency (The Free Review Volume 2 1894)
- The Condition of Morocco (The Asiatic Quarterly Review 1896)
- The Straits of Gibraltar and the Sultanate of Morocco (Pamphlet 1904)
- Morocco the Land of the Paradox (Asian Review 1904)
- The General Situation in Morocco (The North American 1905)
- The Spectator (The North American 1905)
- The Disintegration of Morocco its Immediate Causes and Probable Results (The International Quarterly 1905)
- Morocco the Land of the Extreme West and the Story of my Captivity (National Geographic Magazine 1906)
- Tangier in the Early 70s (Putnam's Monthly 1907)
- How to Enjoy Captivity with Raisul by His Former Captive Mr. Ion Perdicaris (The Sketch 1907)

=== Books ===
- The Case of Mohammed Benani (1887)
- Biography The Hand of Fate (1921)

== Plays ==
- La Societaire (1879)
- The Picture (1879)

== Estates ==
- Perdicaris Ashley Cottage (Trenton N.J.) (1845-1895)
- Place of the Nightingales (Tangier Morocco) (1877-1925)
- The Manor House, Chislehurst Kent (Kent England) (1910-1925)

== Bibliography ==
- Andrianis, Demetrios Constantinos (2021). "Gregory Anthony Perdicaris" (PDF). Digital Academic Research Archives.
- Driver, Stephen William (1895). Report of the Class of 1860, 1890-1895. Cambridge, Mass: John Wilson and Son. pp. 49–50.
- Gregg D. D., Alexander (1905). History of The Old Cheraws Containing An Account of Aborigines of Pedee (PDF). The State Company South Carolina.
