= Edward W. Scudder =

American judge (1822–1893)

Edward Wallace Scudder (August 12, 1822 – February 3, 1893) was a justice of the New Jersey Supreme Court from 1869 until his death.

He graduated from Princeton University in 1841 and then studied law with the Hon. William L. Dayton. He was admitted as an attorney in 1844, and called to the bar in 1848; Scudder was elected to the New Jersey Senate, and served his term there of three years, ending in 1865, the last year serving as president.

He was appointed judge by Governor of New Jersey Theodore Fitz Randolph in 1869, by Governor Joseph D. Bedle in 1876, reappointed by Governor George C. Ludlow in 1883, and by Governor Leon Abbett in 1890.

He died February 3, 1893, and is buried at Riverview Cemetery in Trenton.

== See also ==
- List of justices of the Supreme Court of New Jersey
- New Jersey Court of Errors and Appeals
- Courts of New Jersey
- Newark Evening News
- Richard Scudder
