= Greek Americans =

Americans of Greek birth or descent

Greek Americans Ελληνοαμερικανοί
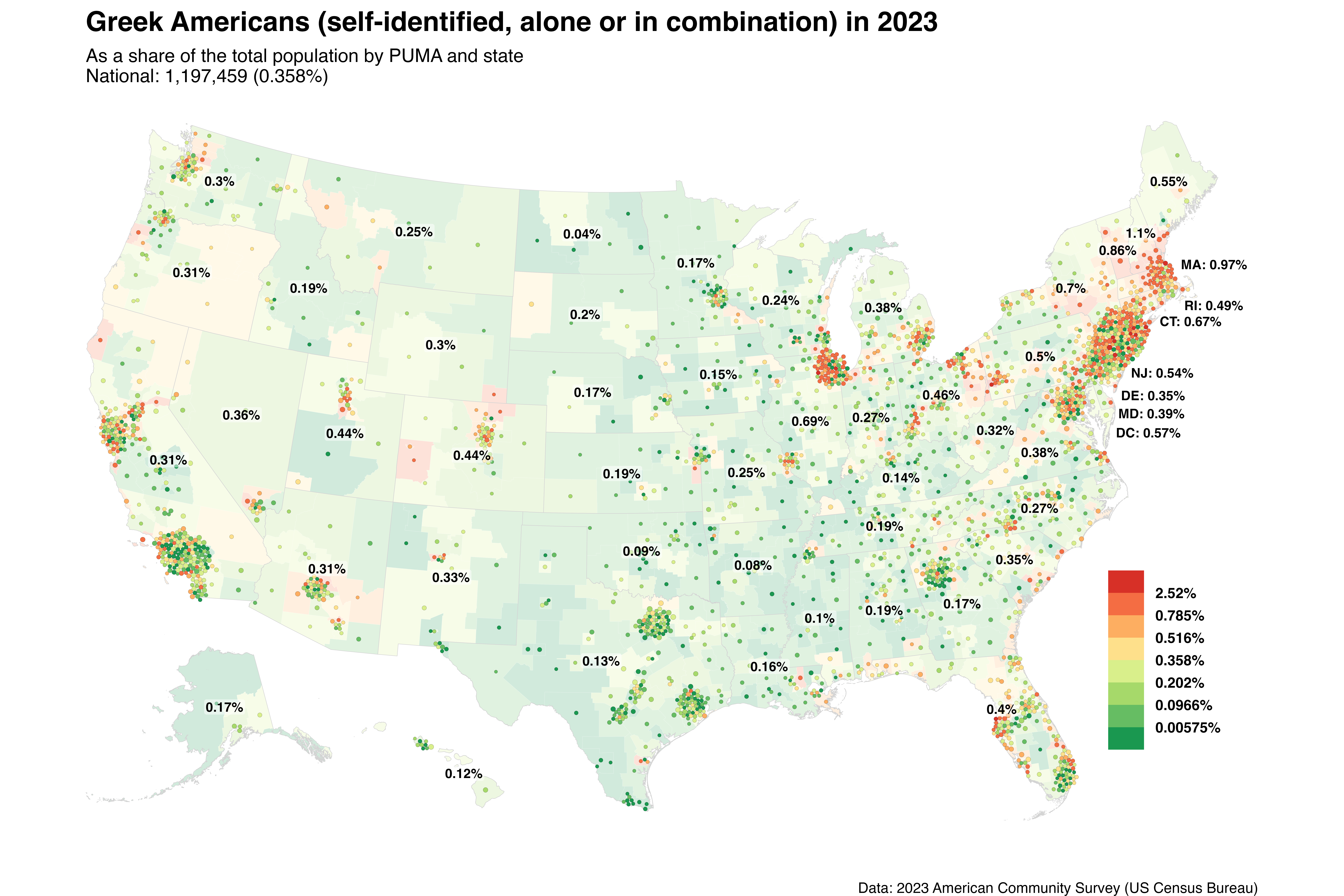

Total population
- 1,308,000 (0.4% of the U.S. population)

Regions with significant populations
- New York City/North Jersey • Baltimore • Chicago • Metro Detroit • San Francisco Bay Area • Los Angeles • Tampa/Tarpon Springs • Philadelphia • Houston • Salt Lake City • Greater Boston

Languages
- American English; Greek

Religion
- Christianity, predominantly Greek Orthodox

Greek Americans (Note: Greek: Ελληνοαμερικανοί Ellinoamerikaní [eliˌno.ameɾikaˈɲi] or Ελληνοαμερικάνοι Ellinoamerikáni [eliˌno.ameɾiˈkaɲi]) are Americans of full or partial Greek ancestry. They number at least 1.2 million, of whom 264,066 (22%) over the age of five speak Greek at home.

The United States is home to the largest number of Greeks outside Greece, followed by Cyprus and Australia. Greek Americans have the highest concentrations in New York City, Boston, and Chicago, but have settled in major metropolitan areas across the United States. In 2000, Tarpon Springs, Florida, was home to the largest community of Greek Americans proportionally, at just over 10%.

Within the New York City region, Astoria, Queens contains a vibrant Greek community and an official Greektown. Officially city-designated Greektowns exist in Chicago, Detroit, and Tarpon Springs in the Tampa area. Greek community enclaves have been found in other metropolitan areas, such as in the San Francisco Bay Area, Los Angeles, Philadelphia, and rural areas such as Campbell, Ohio are home to Greek enclaves. There are also strong Greek communities in Boston, the Salt Lake Valley, and in North Carolina, especially Charlotte and Asheville areas.

== History ==
=== Early history ===
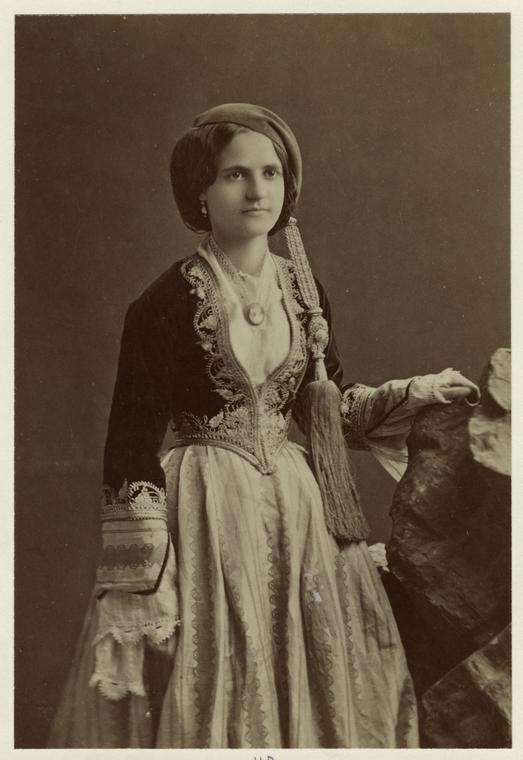
A young Greek immigrant on Ellis Island, New York City, late 19th century

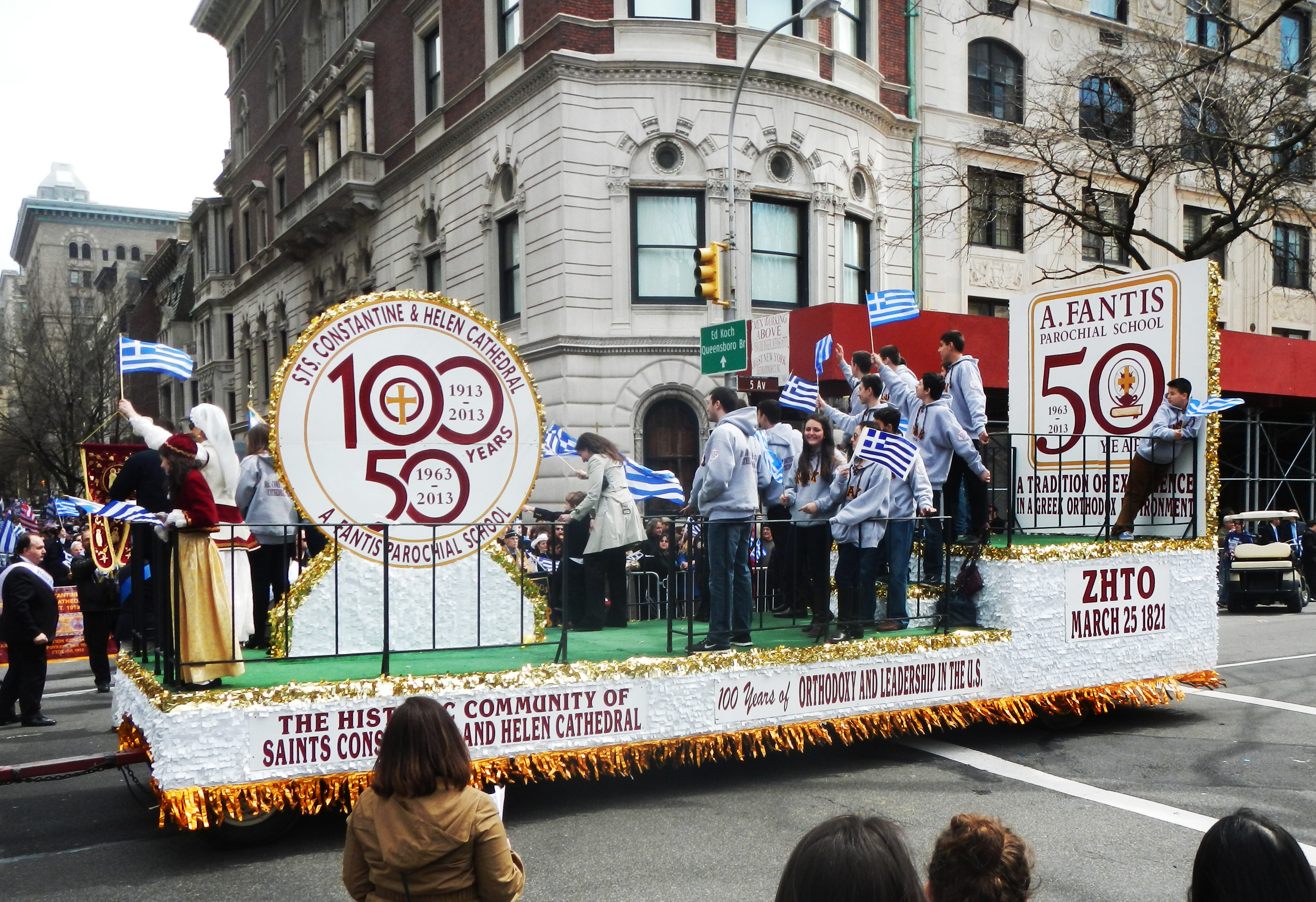
Greek parade at 57th Street, New York State

The first Greek to ever set foot in America was Johan Griego (lit. 'John the Greek'), in 1492. He was a member of Christopher Columbus's first expedition. At least two other Greeks followed soon after; they were brothers who sailed with Columbus in his second (1493) and third (1498) expeditions. Spanish and English historians mention three Greeks who sailed with Ferdinand Magellan in 1520 on his voyage to Patagonia. Their names are listed as: Nikolao, Ioanni, and Mattheo.

Another Greek, Don Doroteo Teodoro, was a sailor who landed in Boca Ciega Bay at the Jungle Prada site in present-day St. Petersburg, Florida with the Narváez expedition in 1528. He was instrumental in building the rafts that the expedition survivors built and sailed from present-day St. Mark's River in Florida until they were shipwrecked near Galveston Island, Texas. Teodoro had been captured by natives as they sailed along the Gulf coast shoreline toward the west, and was never seen again. He was presumably killed by the natives. Don Doroteo Teodoro is regarded as the first Greek to have set foot on soil which is today part of the United States. Pedro de Candia (lit. 'Petros the Cretan', a Greek adventurer and soldier from Crete, is known for being a lieutenant of Francisco Pizarro who conquered the empire of Peru and founded the city of Lima.

When Francis Drake reached Valparaíso, Chile, in 1578 he found there a Greek pilot, whose name was Ioannis. loannis acted as Drake's pilot as far as Lima, Peru. Ten years later, Thomas Cavendish met a Greek pilot by the name of Georgio, who knew the waters of Chile. Both of these Greek pilots must have been in the area for many years in order to have sufficient knowledge of the waters to act as pilots for visiting ships.

In 1592, Greek captain Juan de Fuca (original name: Ioannis Fokas or Apostolos Valerianos) sailed up the Pacific coast under the Spanish flag, in search of the fabled Northwest Passage between the Pacific and the Atlantic. He reported discovering a body of water, a strait which today bears his name: the Strait of Juan de Fuca, which today forms part of the Canada–United States border.

There is a report that a Cretan Greek named Konopios operated a coffeehouse in New England in 1652. Records show that a Greek, Michael Dry (Youris), became a naturalized citizen by act of the General Assembly of Maryland in 1725. This makes Dry the first Greek positively known to reside permanently in what is today the United States.

About 500 Greeks from Smyrna, Crete, and Mani settled in New Smyrna Beach, Florida in 1768. The colony was unsuccessful, and the settlers moved to St. Augustine in 1776. In November 1777, a Greek chapel was established in St. Augustine, where Greeks could pray with their own rites. Almost 200 years later, the chapel was designated the St. Photios Greek Orthodox National Shrine by the Greek Orthodox Church, and it exists today as a remnant of their presence, having been built atop the site of the Avero House, itself believed to be the first site of Greek Orthodox worship in the United States.

The first noted Greek American scholar was John Paradise. He was persuaded to immigrate to America by Benjamin Franklin and Thomas Jefferson, whom he met in Europe. Paradise married into the notable Ludwell family, one of the most prominent colonial families in Virginia.

Evstratii Delarov, a native of Macedonia, was the first documented Greek explorer and merchant to arrive in Alaska. From 1783 to 1791, he was in charge of all Russian trading operations in the Aleutian Islands and in Alaska. He is today considered to have been the first de facto Governor of Alaska.

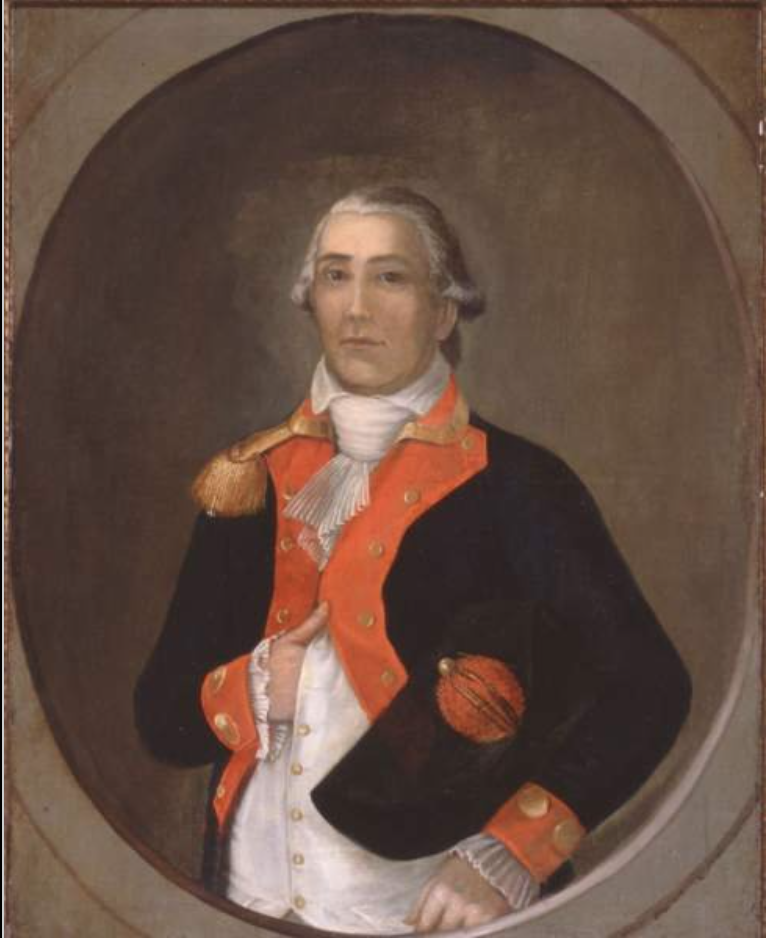
Michel Dragon, a Greek merchant who took part in the American Revolutionary War as a lieutenant.

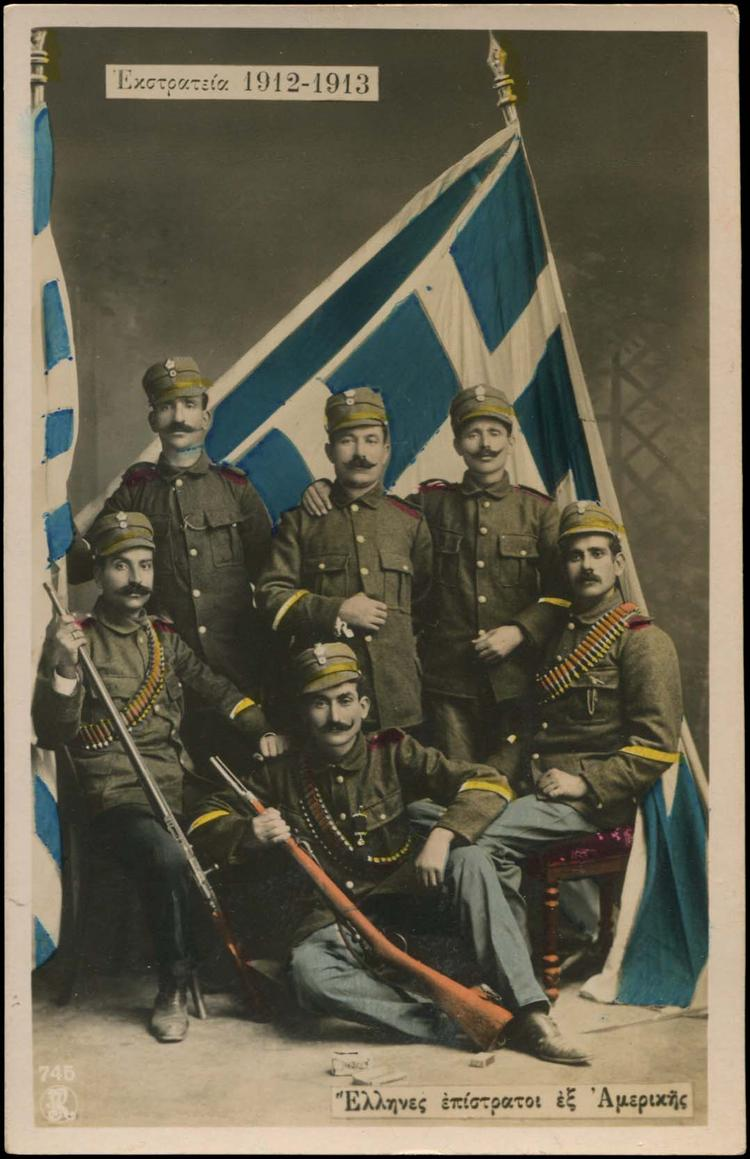
Greek-American volunteers in the Balkan Wars

Early records show Michel Dragon (Michalis Dracos) and Andrea Dimitry (Andrea Drussakis Demetrios) settled in New Orleans around 1799. Michel Dragon was a lieutenant in the American Revolution and Andrea Dimitry participated in the War of 1812. Andrea married Michel Dragon's daughter, Marianne Celeste Dragon, and established a small community in New Orleans. The marriage between them in 1799 was the first known marriage between Greeks in America. His son was United States ambassador to Costa Rica & Nicaragua Alexander Dimitry. Another Greek refugee named George Marshall also came to the United States around this period. He was born in Rhodes in 1782. Marshall joined the United States Navy in 1809 and he wrote Marshall's Practical Marine Gunnery. Marshall had a successful naval career and became master gunner. His son George J Marshall also served in the navy. His son-in-law was George Sirian. Due to problems with the strait of Gibraltar, America was desperate for trade with Europe. Pirates ransomed Americans which led to two Barbary wars. America eventually formed the Mediterranean Squadron.

Romani people from Greece also immigrated to the United States.

=== 19th century ===
Many American ships traveled to the Ottoman Empire, namely Ayvalık. The Greek War of Independence began in 1821 and lasted until 1830. Americans established missionaries in Greece. The missionaries included Jonas King. Prominent American abolitionists Samuel Gridley Howe and Jonathan Peckham Miller participated in the Greek War. Jonathan Peckham Miller adopted Greek orphan Lucas M. Miller. Samuel Gridley Howe also collected a number of refugees and brought them back to Boston. Some of the refugees he brought included John Celivergos Zachos and author Christophorus Plato Castanis.

New England and Boston became home to countless Greek refugees during the 1820s. Some of them were: Author Petros Mengous, Photius Fisk, Gregory Anthony Perdicaris, Evangelinos Apostolides Sophocles, George Colvocoresses, Garafilia Mohalbi. There was a large Greek presence at Mount Pleasant Classical Institute and other local universities. There were hundreds of Greek orphans that arrived in New England. Some drastically contributed to the United States of America. The Greek Slave Movement was initiated by Boston abolitionists.

The Greek Slave Movement started in the 1820s during the influx of young refugees to New England. The movement contributed to countless paintings, sculptures, poems, essays, and songs. The death of Greek slave Garafilia Mohalbi was a trigger for sympathy. She was featured in many poems and songs. The Greek Slave Movement was so popular in American media that sculptor Hiram Powers created The Greek Slave. The Greek Slave Movement was an abolitionist tool to abolish slavery in the United States. The theme eventually exploded some examples include: The Slave Market (Gérôme painting), The Slave Market (Boulanger painting), and the slave Market Otto Pilny. Some of the young Greek refugees became abolitionists.

John Celivergos Zachos became a prominent educator. He was also a woman's rights activist and abolitionist. Photius Fisk was another abolitionist who fought for the anti-slavery cause. Gregory Anthony Perdicaris was a wealthy millionaire who created the framework for gas and electric companies. George Colvocoresses was a captain in the United States Navy. Colvos Passage is named after him. George Sirian was another seaman in the United States Navy. The George Sirian Meritorious Service Award is named after him. Harvard created an entire department for Evangelinos Apostolides Sophocles. Greek orphan Lucas Miltiades Miller became a U.S. Congressman.

In the American Civil War, Greek Americans fought for both sides, Union and Confederate, with prominent Greeks such as George Colvocoresses, John Celivergos Zachos and Photius Fisk taking part in the war on the side of the Union. A Greek Company within the Confederate Louisiana Militia was formed for Greeks who fought for the Confederate States of America.

After the Civil War, the Greek community continued to flourish in New Orleans, Louisiana. By 1866, the community was numerous and prosperous enough to have a Greek consulate and the first official Greek Orthodox Church in the United States. During that period, most Greek immigrants to the New World came from Asia Minor and those Aegean Islands still under Ottoman rule. By 1890, there were almost 15,000 Greeks living in the U.S.

Immigration picked up again in the 1890s and early 20th century, due largely to economic opportunity in the U.S., displacement caused by the hardships of Ottoman rule, the Balkan Wars, and World War I. Most of these immigrants had come from southern Greece, especially from the Peloponnesian provinces of Laconia and Arcadia. 450,000 Greeks arrived to the States between 1890 and 1917, most working in the cities of the northeastern United States; others labored on railroad construction and in mines of the western United States; another 70,000 arrived between 1918 and 1924. Each wave of immigration contributed to the growth of Philhellenism in the U.S.

Greek immigration at this time was over 90% male, contrasted with most other European immigration to the U.S., such as Italian and Irish immigration, which averaged 50% to 60% male. Many Greek immigrants expected to work and return to their homeland after earning capital and dowries for their families. However, the loss of their homeland due to the Greek genocide and the 1923 population exchange between Greece and Turkey, which displaced 1,500,000 Greeks from Anatolia, Eastern Thrace, and Pontus caused the initial economic immigrants to reside permanently in America. The Greeks were de jure denaturalized from their homelands and lost the right to return, and their families were made refugees. Additionally, the first widely implemented U.S. immigration limits against non Western European immigrants were made in 1924, creating an impetus for immigrants to apply for citizenship, bring their families and permanently settle in the U.S. Fewer than 30,000 Greek immigrants arrived in the U.S. between 1925 and 1945, most of whom were "picture brides" for single Greek men and family members coming over to join relatives.

=== 20th century ===
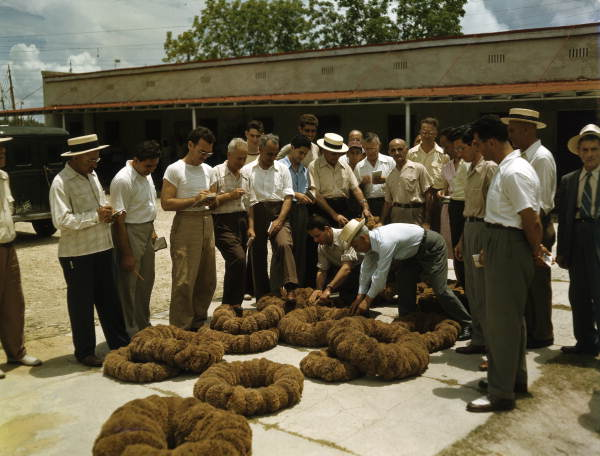
Sponge auction in Tarpon Springs, Florida, in 1947. The community has the highest percentage of Greek Americans of any city in the U.S.

In 1909, there was a pogrom against the Greek population in South Omaha.

The events of the early 1920s also provided the stimulus for the first permanent national Greek American religious and civic organizations. In 1922, as a response to the anti-Greek campaign and actions of the Ku Klux Klan, the American Hellenic Educational Progressive Association was founded. AHEPA aimed to counter the xenophobic sentiments directed at Greek immigrants by promoting non-violence, educational outreach and the full Americanization of the Greek community. Anti-immigrant sentiment, particularly among newspapers owned by William Randolph Hearst, provided the background to sensational trials in the 1920s, including the conviction of Alexander Pantages, Greek immigrant and movie theater pioneer, in 1929. His 50-year prison sentence was later overturned.

Greeks again began to arrive in large numbers after 1945, fleeing the economic devastation caused by World War II and the Greek Civil War. From 1945 until 1982, approximately 211,000 Greeks immigrated to the United States. These later immigrants were less influenced by the powerful assimilation pressures of the 1920s and 1930s and revitalized Greek American identity, especially in areas such as Greek-language media.

Greek immigrants founded more than 600 diners in the New York metropolitan area in the 1950s through the 1970s. Immigration to the United States from Greece peaked between the 1950s and 1970. After the 1981 admission of Greece to the European Union, annual U.S. immigration numbers fell to less than 2,000. In recent years, Greek immigration to the United States has been minimal; in fact, net migration has been towards Greece. Over 72,000 U.S. citizens currently live in Greece (1999); most of them are Greek Americans.

The predominant religion among Greeks and Greek Americans is Greek Orthodox Christianity. There are also a number of Americans who descend from Greece's smaller Sephardic and Romaniote Jewish communities.

=== 21st century ===
Front view of the Panaghia, a Greek Orthodox Church at Newport Road, Island Park NY. Fall 2026

The Greek financial crisis triggered a resurgence of Greek immigration to New York City in 2010, which accelerated in 2015, centering on the traditional Greek enclave of Astoria, Queens. According to The New York Times, this new wave of Greek migration was driven less by opportunities in New York City by a lack of economic options in Greece itself. In December 2022, the $85 million, newly rebuilt St. Nicholas Greek Orthodox Church opened in Lower Manhattan, 21 years after being destroyed in the September 11 attacks.

== Demographics ==
Number of Greek Americans
Year	Number
1980	959,856
1990	1,110,373
2000	1,153,307
2010	1,316,074
2020	1,373,622

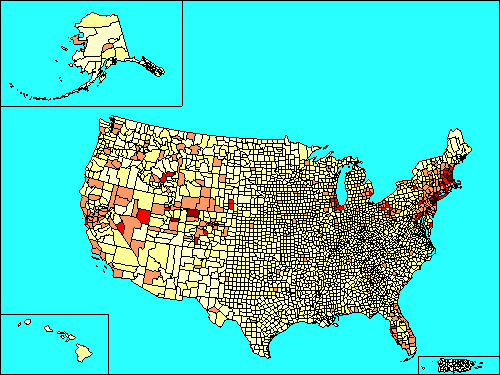
Distribution of Greek Americans according to the 2000 census

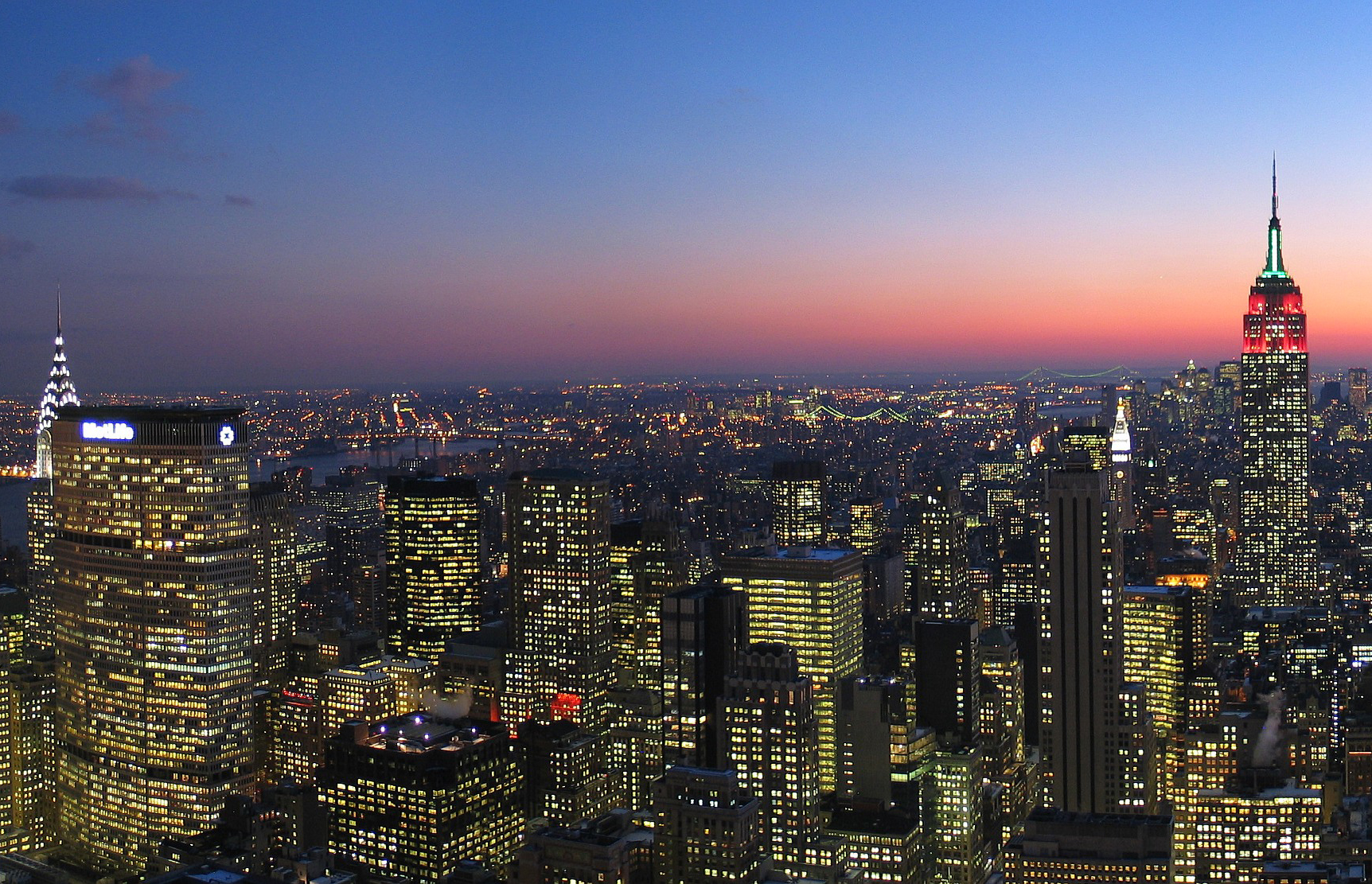
The New York City Metropolitan Area, including Long Island, New York, and Bergen County, New Jersey, is home to the largest Greek population in the United States.

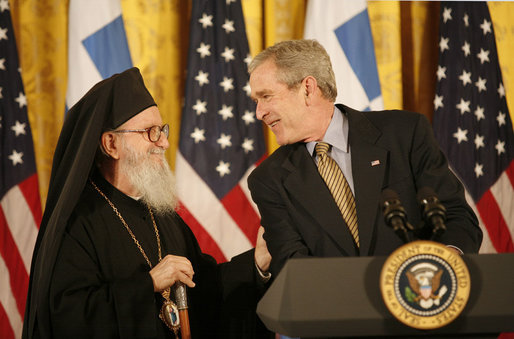
U.S. President George W. Bush welcomes Archbishop Demetrios to the White House to celebrate Greek Independence Day and to recognize the contributions of Greek-Americans to American culture in March 2007

=== Population by state ===
Population by state according to the 2011-2015 American Community Survey.

1. New York – 170,637
2. California – 134,680
3. Illinois – 99,509
4. Florida – 90,647
5. Massachusetts – 83,701
6. New Jersey – 63,940
7. Pennsylvania – 62,168
8. Ohio – 54,614
9. Texas – 47,622
10. Michigan – 42,711
11. Maryland – 33,733
12. Virginia – 33,062
13. Connecticut – 30,304
14. North Carolina – 26,877
15. Washington – 25,665
16. Indiana – 23,993
17. Arizona – 21,742
18. Colorado – 20,239
19. Georgia – 19,519
20. New Hampshire – 18,434
21. Wisconsin – 16,386
22. Missouri – 15,920
23. Utah – 14,088
24. Oregon – 13,847
25. South Carolina – 13,552
26. Nevada – 11,977
27. Minnesota – 11,782
28. Tennessee – 11,345
29. Alabama – 8,081
30. Rhode Island – 7,485
31. Maine – 7,164
32. Kentucky – 6,887
33. Louisiana – 6,636
34. Iowa – 6,415
35. Kansas – 5,315
36. Oklahoma – 5,261
37. West Virginia – 4,722
38. New Mexico – 4,110
39. Idaho – 3,869
40. Delaware – 3,851
41. Nebraska – 3,840
42. Arkansas – 3,082
43. Montana – 3,062
44. Mississippi – 3,023
45. Vermont – 2,987
46. Hawaii – 2,479
47. District of Columbia – 2,139
48. Alaska – 2,129
49. Wyoming – 1,701
50. South Dakota – 1,180
51. North Dakota – 690

=== Largest communities ===
According to the 2020 American Community Survey, 1,249,194 Americans had full or partial Greek ancestry, whom 124,428 were born in Greece.

Top CSAs by Ancestry:

1. New York-Newark-Bridgeport, NY-NJ-CT-PA CSA: 187,255
2. Boston-Worcester-Manchester, MA-RI-NH CSA: 95,594
3. Chicago-Naperville, IL-IN-WI CSA: 89,468
4. Los Angeles-Long Beach, CA CSA: 52,416
5. Washington-Baltimore-Arlington, DC-MD-VA-WV-PA CSA: 48,597
6. San Jose-San Francisco-Oakland, CA CSA: 40,277
7. Philadelphia-Reading-Camden, PA-NJ-DE-MD CSA: 36,432
8. Detroit–Warren–Ann Arbor, MI CSA: 31,547
9. Miami-Port St. Lucie-Fort Lauderdale, FL CSA: 23,725

Top CSAs by Country of Birth:

1. New York-Newark-Bridgeport, NY-NJ-CT-PA CSA: 37,225
2. Chicago-Naperville, IL-IN-WI CSA: 12,070
3. Boston-Worcester-Manchester, MA-RI-NH CSA: 10,843
4. Los Angeles-Long Beach, CA CSA: 5,484
5. Washington-Baltimore-Arlington, DC-MD-VA-WV-PA CSA: 5,016
6. Philadelphia-Reading-Camden, PA-NJ-DE-MD CSA: 5,014
7. San Jose-San Francisco-Oakland, CA CSA: 3,424
8. Miami-Port St. Lucie-Fort Lauderdale, FL CSA: 2,711
9. Detroit–Warren–Ann Arbor, MI CSA: 2,337

Top MSAs by Ancestry:

1. New York-Newark-Bridgeport, NY-NJ-CT-PA CSA: 159,180
2. Chicago-Naperville-Elgin, IL-IN-WI: 87,864
3. Boston-Worcester-Manchester, MA-RI-NH CSA: 65,041
4. Los Angeles-Long Beach-Anaheim, CA: 39,163
5. Philadelphia-Camden-Wilmington, PA-NJ-DE-MD: 30,728
6. Washington-Baltimore-Arlington, DC-MD-VA-WV-PA CSA: 28,450
7. Detroit–Warren–Ann Arbor, MI: 26,290
8. Tampa-St. Petersburg-Clearwater, FL: 24,522
9. San Jose-San Francisco-Oakland, CA CSA: 23,266
10. Miami-Port St. Lucie-Fort Lauderdale, FL CSA: 20,545

Top MSAs by Country of Birth:

1. New York-Newark-Bridgeport, NY-NJ-CT-PA CSA: 32,801
2. Chicago-Naperville-Elgin, IL-IN-WI: 12,031
3. Boston-Worcester-Manchester, MA-RI-NH CSA: 7,807
4. Los Angeles-Long Beach-Anaheim, CA: 4,512
5. Philadelphia-Camden-Wilmington, PA-NJ-DE-MD: 4,347
6. Tampa-St. Petersburg-Clearwater, FL: 3,969
7. Washington-Baltimore-Arlington, DC-MD-VA-WV-PA CSA: 3,101
8. Miami-Port St. Lucie-Fort Lauderdale, FL: 2,602
9. Bridgeport-Stamford-Norwalk-Danbury, CT: 2,302
10. San Jose-San Francisco-Oakland, CA CSA: 2,091
11. Detroit–Warren–Ann Arbor, MI: 2,076

Top States by Ancestry:

1. New York: 143,481
2. California: 129,127
3. Illinois: 91,086
4. Florida: 89,658
5. Massachusetts: 76,317
6. New Jersey: 59,665
7. Pennsylvania: 59,477
8. Ohio: 53,057
9. Texas: 48,697
10. Michigan: 44,042

Top States by Country of Birth:

1. New York: 29,017
2. Illinois: 12,031
3. California: 10,742
4. Massachusetts: 9,705
5. Florida: 9,565
6. New Jersey: 8,872
7. Pennsylvania: 5,865
8. Connecticut: 4,074
9. Texas: 3,965
10. Maryland: 3,312

=== Communities by percentage of people of Greek ancestry ===
The U.S. communities with the highest percentage of people claiming Greek ancestry are:

1. Tarpon Springs, Florida 10.4%
2. Campbell, Ohio 9.30%
3. Lincolnwood, Illinois 7.60%
4. Plandome Manor, New York 7.50%
5. Englewood Cliffs, New Jersey 7.20%
6. Allenwood, New Jersey 6.60%
7. South Barrington, Illinois 6.00%
8. Palos Hills, Illinois 5.40%
9. Nahant, Massachusetts 5.30%
10. Alpine, New Jersey; Holiday, Florida; and Munsey Park, New York 5.20%
11. East Marion, New York 5.00%
12. Grosse Pointe Shores, Michigan and Grosse Pointe Township, Michigan; Palos Park, Illinois; and Upper Brookville, New York 4.90%
13. Harbor Isle, New York 4.70%
14. Lake Dalecarlia, Indiana 4.50%
15. Barnum Island, New York 4.40%
16. Peabody, Massachusetts 4.30%
17. Livingston Manor, New York and University Gardens, New York 4.20%
18. Oak Brook, Illinois 4.00%
19. Dracut, Massachusetts 3.90%
20. Harwood Heights, Illinois and Oyster Bay Cove, New York 3.80%
21. Fort Lee, New Jersey; Hiller, Pennsylvania; Ipswich, Massachusetts; Long Grove, Illinois; Oakhurst, New Jersey; and Yorkville, Ohio 3.70%
22. Broomall, Pennsylvania; Garden City South, New York; Norwood Park, Chicago, Illinois (neighborhood); and Plandome, New York 3.60%
23. Flower Hill, New York; Manhasset, New York; Monte Sereno, California; Norridge, Illinois; Palisades Park, New Jersey; Palos Township, IL; and Windham, New York 3.50%
24. Morton Grove, Illinois; Terryville, New York; and Wellington, Utah 3.40%
25. Banks Township, PA (Carbon County, PA); Harmony, Pennsylvania (Beaver County, PA); Plandome Heights, New York; and Watertown, Massachusetts 3.30%
26. Niles, Illinois and Niles Township, Illinois 3.20%
27. Groveland, Massachusetts 3.10%
28. Albertson, New York; Caroline, New York; Graeagle, California; Lynnfield, Massachusetts; Marple Township, Pennsylvania; and Stanhope, New Jersey 3.00%
29. Foster Township, Pennsylvania; Manhasset Hills, New York; West Falmouth, Massachusetts; Winfield, Indiana; and Worth Township, Indiana (Boone County, IN) 2.90%

=== Communities by percentage of those born in Greece ===
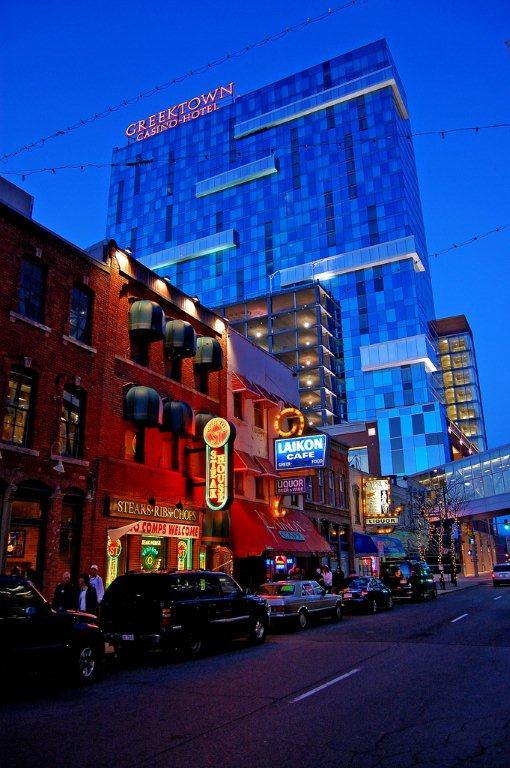
Greektown, Detroit

The U.S. communities with the largest percentage of residents born in Greece are:

Greek speakers in the U.S.
Year	Speakers
1910^{a}	118,379
1920^{a}	174,658
1930^{a}	189,066
1940^{a}	165,220
1960^{a}	180,781
1970^{a}	193,745
1980	401,443
1990	388,260
2000	365,436
2011	304,928
2019	264,066
^a Foreign-born population only

1. Horse Heaven, Washington 3.8%
2. Tarpon Springs, Florida 3.2%
3. Palos Hills, Illinois 3.1%
4. Harbor Isle, New York 3.1%
5. Campbell, Ohio 3.1%
6. Lincolnwood, Illinois 2.7%
7. Englewood Cliffs, New Jersey 2.5%
8. Bedford Park, Illinois 2.3%
9. Twin Lakes, Florida 2.3%
10. Holiday, Florida 2.1%
11. Great Neck Gardens, New York 2.1%
12. Norridge, Illinois 2.0%
13. Palos Park, Illinois 1.9%
14. Barnum Island, New York 1.9%
15. Munsey Park, New York 1.8%
16. Foxfield, Colorado 1.7%
17. Cedar Glen West, New Jersey 1.7%
18. Raynham Center, Massachusetts 1.6%
19. Broomall, Pennsylvania 1.6%
20. Flower Hill, New York 1.6%
21. Alpine, New Jersey 1.6%
22. Millbourne, Pennsylvania 1.6%
23. Niles, Illinois 1.6%
24. Grosse Pointe Shores, Michigan 1.6%
25. East Marion, New York 1.6%
26. West Falmouth, Massachusetts 1.6%
27. Golden Triangle, New Jersey 1.5%
28. Palisades Park, New Jersey 1.5%
29. Garden City South, New York 1.5%
30. Harwood Heights, Illinois 1.5%
31. Watertown, Massachusetts 1.5%
32. Morton Grove, Illinois 1.5%
33. East Ithaca, New York 1.4%
34. Fort Lee, New Jersey 1.4%
35. Saddle Rock, New York 1.4%
36. Oakhurst, New Jersey 1.4%
37. Plandome Manor, New York 1.3%
38. White Lake, North Carolina 1.3%
39. Old Brookville, New York 1.2%
40. Plandome Heights, New York 1.2%
41. South Barrington, Illinois 1.2%
42. North Lakeville, Massachusetts 1.2%
43. Terryville, New York 1.2%
44. Jefferson, West Virginia 1.2%
45. Ridgefield, New Jersey 1.2%
46. East Norwich, New York 1.2%
47. Skokie, Illinois 1.1%
48. Arlington Heights, Pennsylvania 1.1%
49. Pomona, New York 1.1%
50. Spring House, Pennsylvania 1.1%
51. Hickory Hills, Illinois 1.1%
52. Cliffside Park, New Jersey 1.1%
53. Friendship Village, Maryland 1.1%
54. Kingsville, Maryland 1.1%
55. Arlington, Massachusetts 1.1%
56. Mount Prospect, Illinois 1.1%
57. Midland Park, New Jersey 1.0%
58. Lake Dalecarlia, Indiana 1.0%
59. Pinedale, Wyoming 1.0%
60. Glenview, Illinois 1.0%
61. Dunn Loring, Virginia 1.0%
62. West Kennebunk, Maine 1.0%
63. Shokan, New York 1.0%
64. Beacon Square, Florida 1.0%
65. Peabody, Massachusetts 1.0%
66. Dedham, Massachusetts 1.0%
67. North Key Largo, Florida 1.0%
68. Hillside, New York 1.0%
69. Orland Park, Illinois 1.0%
70. Eddystone, Pennsylvania 1.0%
71. South Hempstead, New York 1.0%
72. Redington Beach, Florida 1.0%
73. Hillsmere Shores, Maryland 1.0%

=== Greek-born population ===
Greek-born population in the U.S. since 2010 (ACS 1 Tear Estimates):

Year	Number
2010	135,639
2011	▲138,269
2012	▼134,956
2013	▲137,084
2014	▼136,906
2015	▲141,325
2016	▼135,484
2017	▼130,967
2018	▼125,699
2019	▼119,571

== Print media ==
The front page of Atlantis, Tuesday, November 14, 1972

The Atlantis (1894–1973) was the first successful Greek-language daily newspaper published in the United States. The newspaper was founded in 1894 by Solon J. and Demetrius J. Vlasto, descendants of the Greek noble family, Vlasto. The paper was headed by a member of the Vlasto family until it closed in 1973. Published in New York City, it had a national circulation and influence. Atlantis supported the royalist faction in Greek politics until the mid-1960s. Atlantis editorial themes included naturalization, war relief, Greek-American business interests, and Greek religious unity.

As of 2020, Ethnikos Kyrix (Greek: Εθνικός Κήρυξ, 1915–) is the only Greek-language daily publication based in the United States. Headquartered in New York City, its articles focus on the Greek diaspora in the United States as well as current events in Greece and Cyprus. In contrast to its competitor Atlantis, Ethnikos Kyrix historically supported liberal causes in Greece and America, including the progressive forces of Eleftherios Venizelos in Greece and the New Deal stateside. A companion weekly edition The National Herald (1997–) is in circulation and features similar content presented in English. The Greek Orthodox Archdiocese of America publishes the monthly Orthodox Observer (1934–) in both Greek and English for news and information regarding the Greek Orthodox Church as a whole, as well as its American parishes.

== In popular culture ==
- Greek American novelist Jeffrey Eugenides won the 2003 Pulitzer Prize for his novel Middlesex, about a Greek American family in Detroit.
- In 1967, Academy Award-winning film-director Elia Kazan published a novel, The Arrangement: A Novel, about a conflicted Greek American living a double life as an advertising executive and muckraking journalist. Kazan, who died in September 2003, was a Greek American.
- The popular 1970s show Kojak, featured Telly Savalas as Greek American police detective Theo Kojak, and his brother George as detective Stavros. Kojak was originally supposed to be Polish (hence the name), but this was changed to match Savalas' profile.
- The 2002 comedy film My Big Fat Greek Wedding portrayed the love story of a Greek American woman (portrayed by Greek Canadian Nia Vardalos) and a non-Greek American man (specifically a White Anglo-Saxon Protestant). It also examines the protagonist's troubled love/hate relationship with her cultural heritage and value system. The movie spawned an unsuccessful TV series, My Big Fat Greek Life. The sequel, My Big Fat Greek Wedding 2, was released in March 2016.
- The Famous Teddy Z was an acclaimed but short-lived TV series about a fictional talent agent named Teddy Zakalakis, portrayed by Jon Cryer.
- The TV series Full House was about a family that included Greek American Uncle Jesse Katsopolis, portrayed by Greek American actor John Stamos. Jesse's surname was changed from Cochran to Katsopolis after the first season because Stamos wanted to portray his Greek American heritage. Jesse's Greek dad was also a recurring character. Stamos reprises the role of Jesse in the 2016 sequel sitcom, Fuller House.
- The Olympia Cafe was a recurring sketch in the early years of Saturday Night Live. More recently, Tina Fey has often joked about her Greek heritage on the show.
- Tom's Restaurant, a Greek American owned business, has become one of the symbols of urban New York life.
- Elektra Natchios is a Marvel Comics superhero, portrayed by Jennifer Garner in the 2003 movie Daredevil and the 2005 movie Elektra. Élodie Yung portrays the character in the second season of the Netflix series Daredevil, which debuted in 2016.
- Several entertainers and other performing artists including Johnny Otis, Tina Fey, Kelly Clarkson, Alexander Frey, John Aniston, Jennifer Aniston, Melina Kanakaredes, Zach Galifianakis, Jason Mantzoukas, Tommy Lee, Demetri Martin, Paul Cavonis, Criss Angel, Elias Koteas, Amy Sedaris, Andy Milonakis, Art Alexakis and Billy Zane are of Greek descent.
- Writer, performer and radio-commentator David Sedaris satirizes growing up in a Greek American household in suburban North Carolina in several of his essays.
- Athletes such as Pete Sampras, Harry Agganis, George Karlaftis, Chris Chelios, Dean Karnazes, Alex Karras, Alexi Lalas, Dave Bautista, Greg Louganis, Nick Markakis, Kurt Rambis, Tom Pappas and Jim Londos are of Greek descent.
- New Greek Television Inc., NGTV on Time Warner Cable a rebranding of the 25 year old Greek Television Channel of New York

== Greek nationality ==
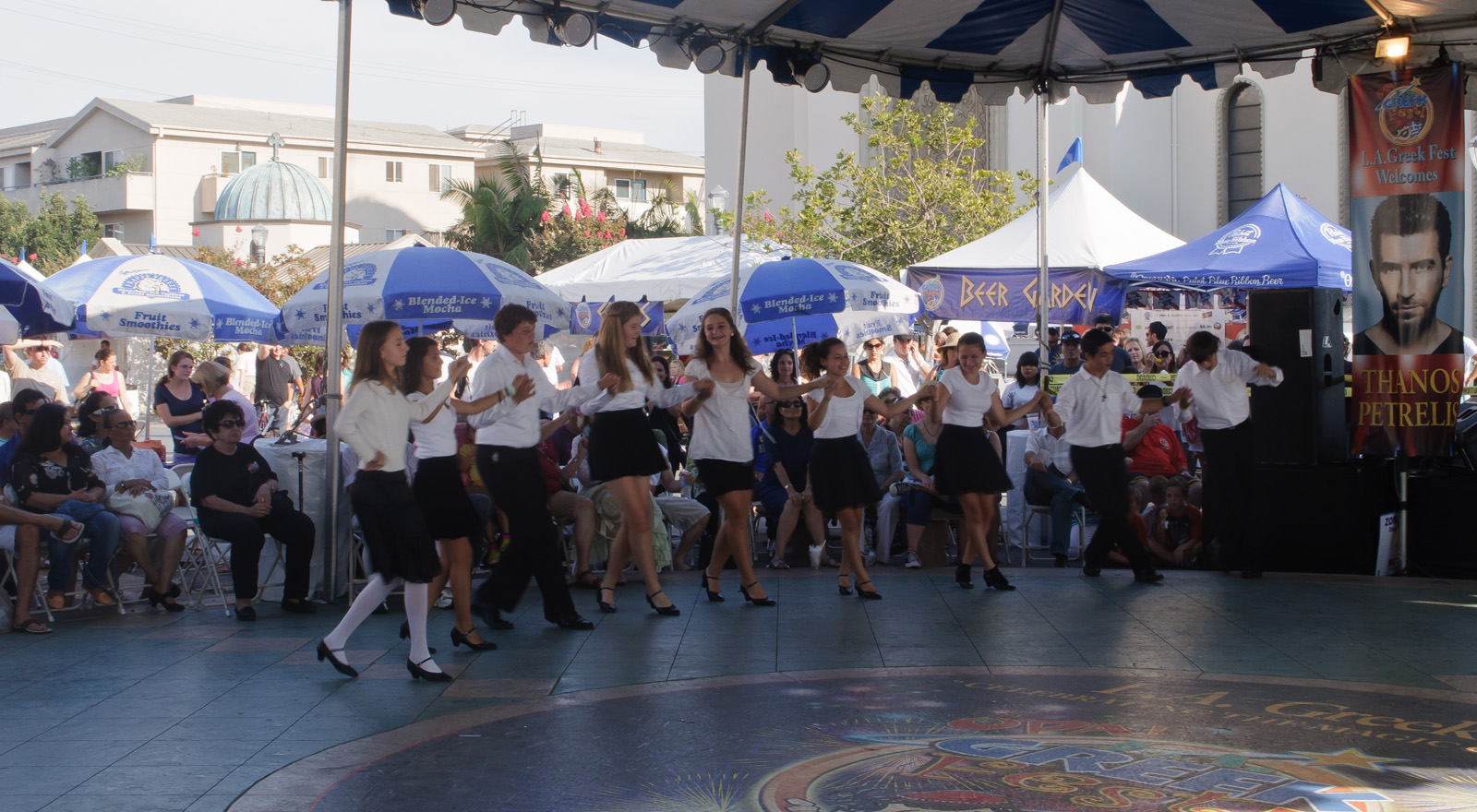
Los Angeles Greek Festival

Any person who is ethnically Greek born outside of Greece may become a Greek citizen through naturalization by proving that a parent or grandparent was born as a national of Greece. The Greek ancestor's birth certificate and marriage certificate are required, along with the applicant's birth certificate and the birth certificates of all generations in between until the relation between the applicant and the person with Greek citizenship is proven.

== Organizations ==
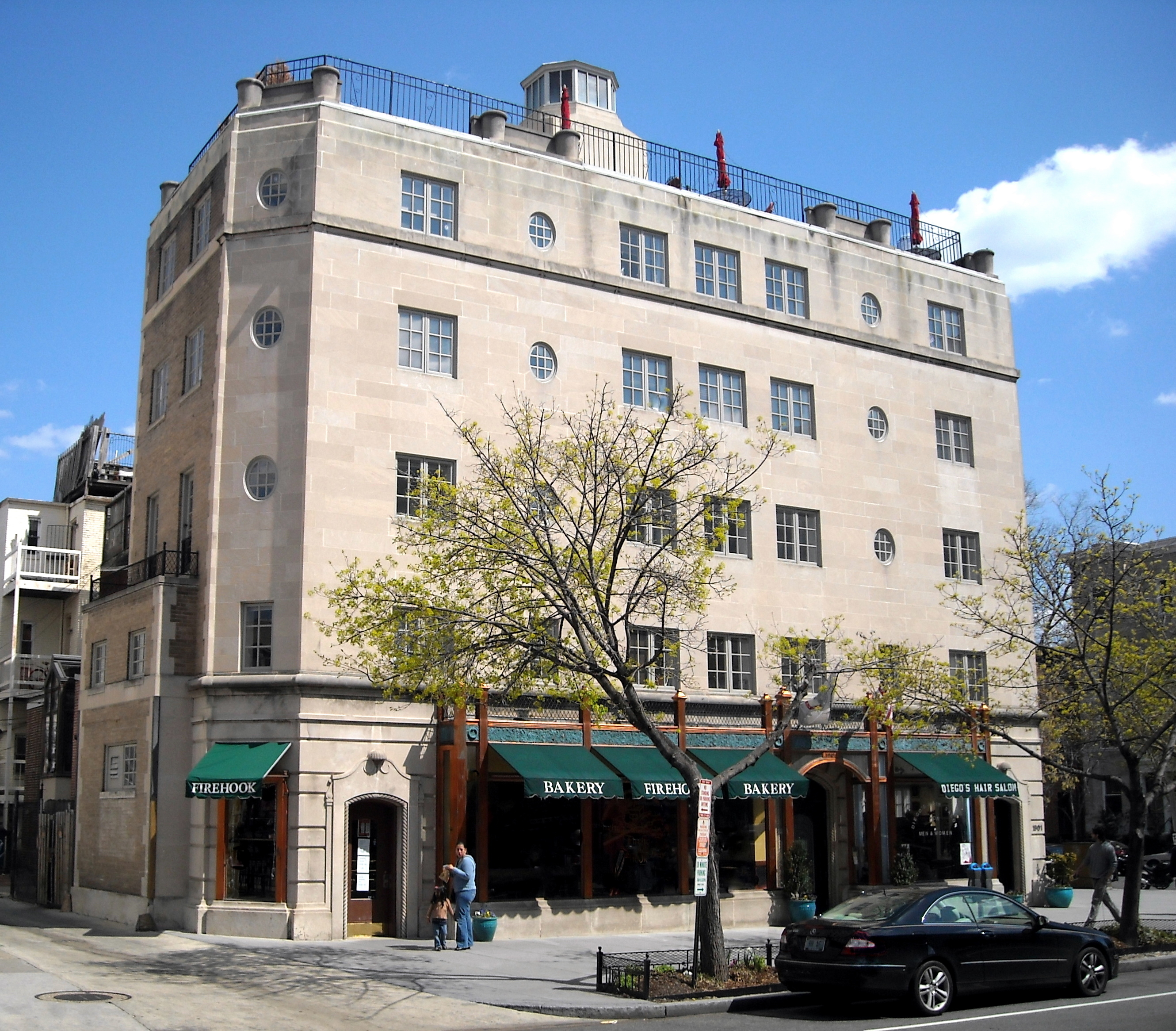
American Hellenic Educational Progressive Association headquarters in Washington, D.C.

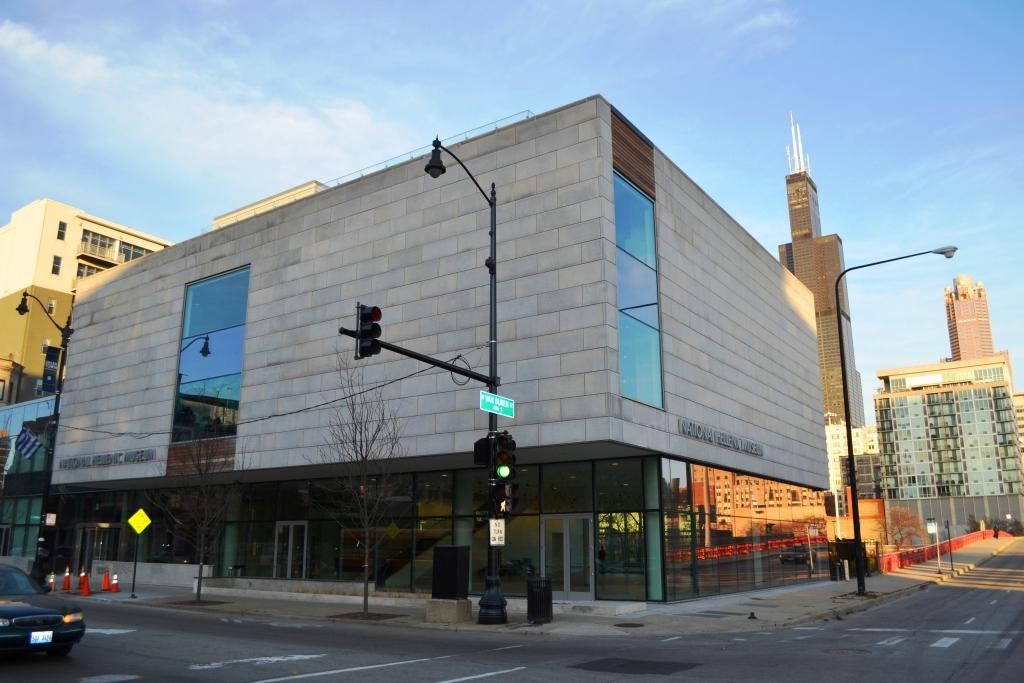
The new National Hellenic Museum, Chicago

There are hundreds of regional, religious and professional Greek American organizations. Some of the largest and most notable include:

- The American Hellenic Educational Progressive Association (AHEPA) is the largest community organization of Greek Americans. It was founded in Atlanta, Georgia in 1922 to counter the anti-Greek attacks by the Ku Klux Klan during that time period. Its current membership exceeds 28,000. 385 active chapters are located in the United States with additional chapters in Canada, and Europe. AHEPA maintains a full-time staff at the AHEPA Global Headquarters located in Washington, DC www.ahepa.org
- The Greek Orthodox Archdiocese of America is the religious organization most closely associated with the Greek American community. It was established in 1921, and is under the leadership of the Ecumenical Patriarchate of Constantinople. The church operates the Greek Orthodox Youth of America, the largest Orthodox Christian youth group in the United States.
- The American Hellenic Institute, an advocacy group for Greek Americans, and its lobbying arm, the American Hellenic Institute Public Affairs Committee.
- The Next Generation Initiative, a foundation that works with prominent Greek American leaders and executives to offer educational opportunities such as internships and master classes through a network of more than 5,500 Greek American students and 2,500 professors on 200+ college campuses.
- The Council of Hellenes Abroad is a Greek government sponsored umbrella organization for Greek immigrant organizations worldwide.
- The Hellenic Society Paideia has been promoting Hellenism and Orthodoxy since 1977 by placing Greek and Byzantium classes in high schools and universities, offering study abroad programs to Greece year round, and with various building projects throughout the country. Anywhere from 200 to 500 students travel to Greece with Paideia per year. Information specifically for the study abroad programs can be found at www.hellenicstudiespaideia.org Currently "Paideia" is constructing a Classical Greek Amphitheater at the University of Connecticut and a Center for Hellenic Studies at the University of Rhode Island.
- The National Hellenic Student Association (NHSA) is the independent network of the Hellenic Student Associations (HSAs) across the United States. By linking all the Greek, Greek-American and Cypriot students of the American educational institutions, the organization can promote ideas and projects and enrich the Hellenic spirit on campuses nationwide.
- Many topika somatéa (local councils) or clubs representing the local regional homeland of Greeks in America. Among the scores of such clubs, larger "umbrella" organizations include the Pan Macedonian Association (one example is the Drosopigi Society, in Rochester, New York, hailing from the village of Drosopigi in Northern Greece outside of the city of Florina) the Panepirotic Federation, the Pan Cretan Association, the Pan-Icarian Brotherhood, the Pan Pontian Federation of U.S.A-Canada, the Chios Societies of America & Canada, the Cyprus Federation of America, the Pan-Laconian Federation of the USA & Canada, the Pan-Messinian Federation of the USA & Canada, the Pan-Arcadian Federation of America and several associations of refugees from areas in the former Ottoman territories.
- The National Hellenic Museum in Greektown, Chicago

== See also ==
- Greek diaspora
- Grecian Echoes
- Greek Festival
- Greece–United States relations
