= Yanna =

Yanna is a given name. Notable people with the name include:

- Yanna Cholaeva (born 1985), Russian acrobatic gymnast
- Yanna Darili, Greek-American model
- Yanna Hadatty (born 1969), Ecuadorian short story writer
- Yanna Krupnikov, political scientist
- Yanna Lavigne (born 1989), Brazilian actress and model
- Yanna McIntosh (born 1970), Canadian actress
