= Zion Episcopal Church (Queens) =

Coordinates: 40°45′59″N 73°44′37″W

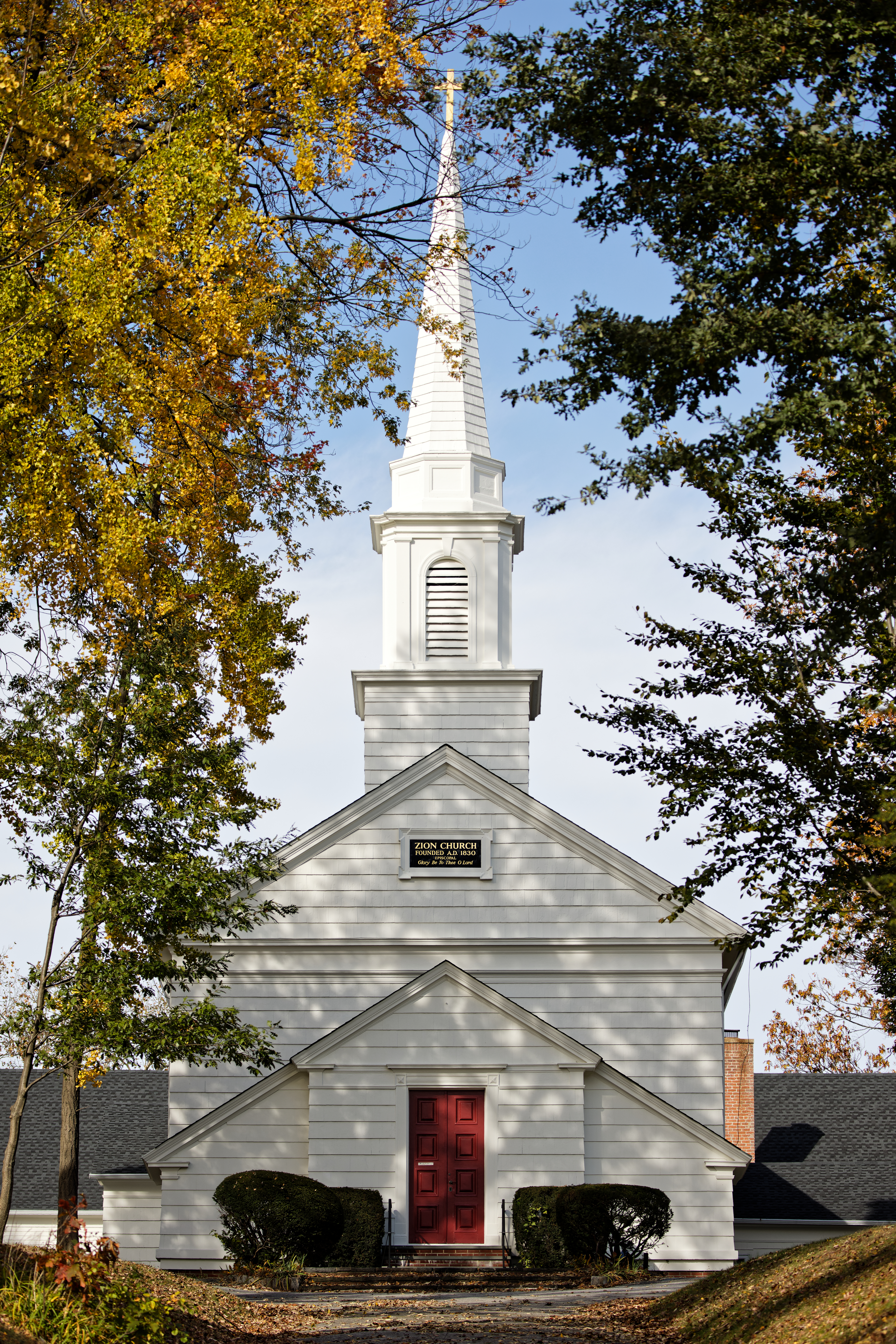
Zion Episcopal Church

Zion Church is an inclusive Episcopal congregation in Douglaston, New York with members from throughout the borough of Queens, and from Nassau County. Zion is within the Episcopal Diocese of Long Island, and is one of the oldest churches in Queens, standing at the top of the hill overlooking Douglaston and Little Neck.

== History ==
Wynant Van Zandt donated land for the building of a church in what was then known as Little Neck, New York, and the cornerstone was laid in 1829. The church opened for worship in 1830. A fire destroyed the original church building in 1924, and Zion was rebuilt and was ready for the Christmas 1925 service. The church building (designed by Aubrey B. Grantham) the extensive grounds including a cemetery, and the 1890 rectory are listed on the National Register of Historic Places as contributing buildings and sites within the Douglaston Hill Historic District.

In the late 1860s, bandits harassed the communities on the north shore of Long Island, and when one gang leader, Jefferson Knight (who had worked as a coachman for the Rev. Beare), was captured in 1869, he led authorities to the "secret bunker" where his booty was hidden: the Zion Church belfry. Among the colorful characters who were members of the church were Bloodgood Cutter and the family of Thomas Merton. Merton, whose father had once been the organist at Zion and who later converted to Catholicism, made some unflattering comments about Zion and Protestants in his book, The Seven Storey Mountain.

The church has held a Strawberry Festival every year since its founding in 1830. The event serves as both a fundraiser and an important outreach event to the wider community. Since 1998, Zion has presented the Van Zandt Award to a local person for outstanding community service; the event is usually held at the Douglaston Club. Every October, the church holds a special outdoor (weather permitting) St. Francis "blessing of the animals" service, where many pets are brought to Zion from both parishioners and non-parishioners. Many community organizations, self-help groups, and 12-step groups meet at the church, including AA, the Douglaston Community Theater, and the Great Commission Church of New York, a Korean congregation.

When Northern Boulevard (Route 25A) was being widened and straightened in the early 1930s, the graves of numerous Matinecoc Indians were disturbed. The remains were re-buried in the churchyard of Zion Church in 1931 beneath a monument consisting of a tree growing between a large boulder that had been split in half. The inscription reads: "Here rest the last of the Matinecoc."

Among the Civil War veterans buried in the Zion Churchyard is Sergeant John H. Starkins, who was awarded the U.S. Medal of Honor for his valiant service against Confederate forces at Campbell Station, Tennessee, on November 16, 1863.

Zion Church adopted a mission statement that reads in part: "Zion Parish is inclusive not exclusive. We call everyone to follow Christ. We respect each other and have no second-class members."

Zion Church was the filming location for the movie First Reformed starring Ethan Hawke.

== List of rectors ==
1. The Rev. Eli Wheeler (1830–1837)
2. 1837–1842 (no Rector)
3. The Rev. Henry Beare (1842, Minister in charge; 1845–1887, Rector)
4. The Rev. William Stanley Barrows (1888–1890)
5. The Rev. Edgar L. Sanford (1890–1892)
6. The Rev. Charles N. F. Jeffrey (1892–1898)
7. The Rev. Dr. John B. Blanchet (1898–1901)
8. The Rev. Robert M. W. Black (1901–1902)
9. The Rev. Robert Bentley (1902–1917)
10. The Rev. Robert Black (1918–1928)
11. The Rev. Dr. Lester L. Riley (1928–1942)
12. The Rev. Dr. Henry Santorio (1943, Locum. Tenes)
13. The Rev. Marland Zimmerman (1943–1948)
14. The Rev. Canon Everett J. Downes (1948–1969)
15. The Rev. Rex Littledale Burrell (1970–1986)
16. The Rev. Canon Phillip L. Lewis (1987, Interim Priest-in-Charge)
17. The Rev. Dallas B. Decker (1987–1990)
18. The Rev. Canon F. Anthony Cayless (Interim Priest-in-Charge)
19. The Rev. Canon James C. Wattley (Interim Priest-in-Charge)
20. The Ven. L. Roper Shamhart (Interim Priest-in-Charge)
21. The Rev. Patrick J. Holtkamp (1992–2011)
22. The Rev. Lynne A. Grifo (2011–2013, Interim Priest-in-Charge)
23. The Rev. Lindsay S. Lunnum (2013–present)
