= WNTN =

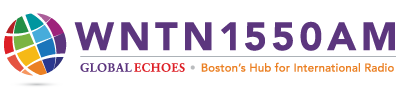
- Cambridge, Massachusetts; United States
- Broadcast area: Greater Boston
- Frequency: 1550 kHz
- Branding: 1550 WNTN Global Echoes

Programming
- Format: Community, ethnic

Ownership
- Owner: Delta Communications, LLC

History
- First air date: April 1, 1968
- Call sign meaning: Newton

Technical information
- Licensing authority: FCC
- Facility ID: 48781
- Class: D
- Power: 6,700 watts (day); 3 watts (night)
- Transmitter coordinates: 42°23′13.35″N 71°8′19.19″W

Links
- Public license information: Public file; LMS
- Webcast: Listen Live
- Website: wntn1550am.com

WNTN (1550 kHz) is a radio station licensed to Cambridge, Massachusetts, serving the Greater Boston area, it is owned by Delta Communications. WNTN is powered at 6,700 watts by day; because 1550 AM is a Canadian clear channel frequency, WNTN must reduce power at night to three watts. It uses a non-directional antenna at all times, from its transmitter facilities on Birch Street at Bay State Road in Cambridge, while its studios and offices are on Fremont Street in Needham.

WNTN broadcasts a community-based radio format that includes music and talk features. Much of the programming is aimed at the area's many ethnic cultures, including shows broadcast in Greek, Haitian Creole and Italian, as well as to the area's large Irish population.

== History ==
WNTN signed on April 1, 1968, broadcasting a "middle of the road" format from Newton, Massachusetts. After a year of poor ratings, management was convinced, in 1969, to initiate an original format of free-form "Adult Rock" after 2 pm, somewhat similar in style to the radio industry's current adult album alternative format. WNTN's after 2 pm programming featured an eclectic, freeform rock-based format mixed with folk music, progressive rock, soul music, jazz fusion and various other musical genres. With FM radios still a rarity in cars at the time, the station received a boost in listenership and notoriety, primarily due to the Boston area's high concentration of college students and musicians. The "free-form rock" hours were later increased to include the entire broadcast day, by 1970. Two of the earliest members of the staff were music director John Gorman and afternoon host Denny Sanders, both of whom later relocated to Cleveland, and were instrumental in the rise of that city's influential WMMS in the early 1970s. Also working there during the rock days was a young Howard Stern, who from August to December 1975, while studying at Boston University, was an on-air personality at WNTN, his first professional job in the radio industry. Stern claimed that the hiring manager refused to pay him because he was "horrible, and nobody would pay you". Stern claimed that he offered to work for free, but that request was denied. The free-form progressive rock format lasted until January 1976, when the format reverted to MOR after the station had been recently sold.

In 1977, the station became the first in the Boston radio market to adopt a disco music block. With its unique sound and popular disc jockeys, including Wendy Hunt and Vinnie 'Disco Vinnie' Peruzzi, WNTN experienced a ratings rise and attention from the areas newspapers and television stations. The format's success, however, was short-lived. By the spring of 1978, crosstown FM station WBOS began playing disco music in the evenings and adopted the format full-time that autumn as "Disco 93". In addition, Wendy Hunt left WNTN to work at WBOS in 1978, as did Vinnie Peruzzi. In 1979, he joined another new FM disco station: WXKS-FM "Kiss 108".

Unable to compete with the two FM disco music stations, WNTN switched its format to adult contemporary music mixed with local news and information in 1977. But that format was short-lived; it flipped within a year to oldies music and within six months had a brief catapult into legitimate Boston ratings as the oldies format managed by Rob Wolf, who had earlier hired Howard Stern.

For a brief time in the early 1980s, the station resurrected a disco (or by that time, "contemporary dance music") format, promoted as the "Daytime Nightclub".

In 1987, the station dropped music and changed to a talk radio format consisting of syndicated national talk shows with local and national news updates. Music programming returned by 1993 in the afternoon hours, consisting of mostly adult contemporary however it was dropped completely by 1998.

Since the mid‑1990s, many local AM stations, including WNTN, experienced a downturn in advertising revenue. WNTN responded by adding leased-time programming, allowing groups and individuals to pay for an allotted amount of time on the station and program it to their taste. The station now airs a variety of talk and music shows aimed at numerous ethnicities and age groups.

=== Move to Cambridge ===
From sign-on in 1968. studios and transmitter were at 143 Rumford Avenue in Auburndale area of Newton. In 2015, a construction permit application was filed to diplex WNTN with WJIB in Cambridge and drop power to 750 watts. In early 2017, the radio station was sold to the host of Grecian Echoes; however, the sale did not include the land or the studio building. The new company, Delta Communications, set up studios and offices in Needham, Massachusetts, and began broadcasting from its new transmitter site in March 2017. In 2018, a modification to increase power to 6,700 watts was approved by the Federal Communications Commission.
