= New Greek TV =

American Greek-language television channel

Coordinates: 40°45′41″N 73°55′0″W

- Country: USA
- Broadcast area: New York metropolitan area, Canada
- Headquarters: Astoria, New York

Programming
- Language(s): Greek; English
- Picture format: 4:3 (SDTV)

Ownership
- Owner: New Greek Television USA

History
- Launched: December 1987
- Former names: National Greek TV (1987-2012)

Links
- Website: New Greek TV

New Greek TV (NGTV) is an American Greek language television channel broadcasting from studios in Astoria, New York. It launched in December 1987 as 'National Greek Television' on Time Warner Cable by its founder Demetris Kastanas. NGTV was the first-ever television channel catering to Greek-Americans, airing a mix of original programming produced specifically for the local Greek-American community in New York and area as well as foreign content sourced directly from Greece.

On 2 August 2012, NGTV was sold to a private investment group headed by Greek American celebrity TV host Yanna Darili. Upon taking ownership of the channel, Ms. Darilis subsequently re-branded the channel with a new look and a new focus. The new service, now called 'New Greek TV' is aimed at the new generation of Greek-Americans.

In September 2014, NGTV launched in Canada on Bell Fibe TV via an agreement with Canadian ethnic broadcaster Ethnic Channels Group. It also launched in the USA on RCN Cable; it is currently only available in the New York City market.

== Programming ==
New Greek TV airs a mix of original programming and foreign content from Greece which is sourced from various Greek Channels including Action 24, Open TV and Star Channel. It airs news and current affairs, entertainment, sports, travelogues, cooking shows, talk shows and more.

Original programming on NGTV includes the following:

- NGTV News - Daily newscast in Greek, features local and national news; Monday - Friday at 18:30
- To Bima Tou Ippokrati - Health & wellness program; Wednesdays at 20:30
- Prosopografies - Community news and current affairs
- Kalimera USA - Weekly news magazine; Fridays at 10:00
- Divine Liturgy - Sunday Mass; Sundays at 10:00
- Megales Apokaliptikes Eidiseis - Weekly news magazine; Monday - Sunday at 20:30
