= Yanna Darili =

Greek-American model and actress

Yanna Darili Γιάννα Ντάριλη
- Born: Queens, New York City, U.S.
- Education: Queens College
- Occupations: model, actress, journalist, producer, television presenter, PhD in Original Medicine, wellness and fitness expert
- Height: 5 ft 9 in (1.75 m)

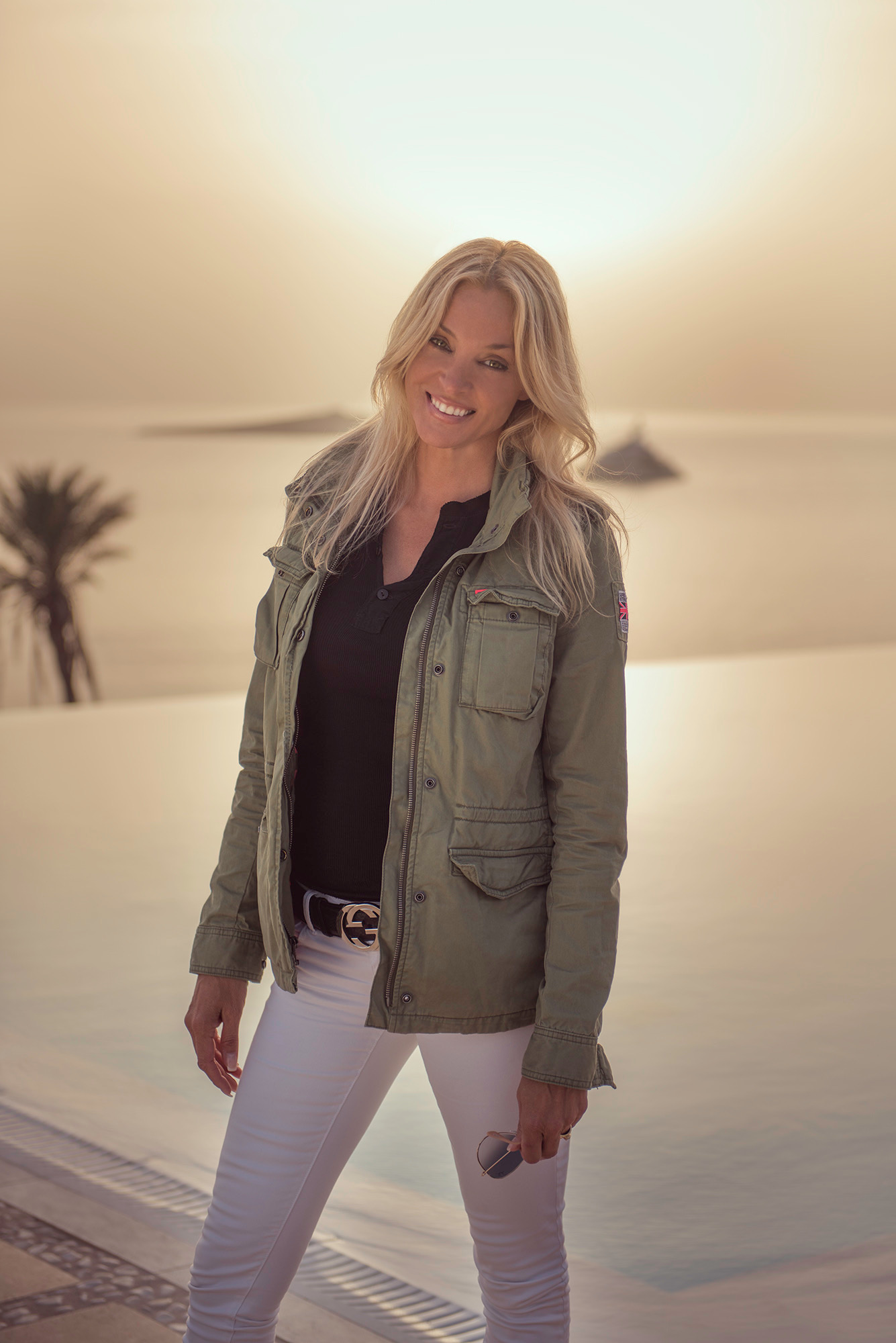

Yanna Darili (Greek:Γιάννα Ντάριλη) is a Greek-American model, actress, journalist, producer, television presenter and fitness expert. Her mother is from the Greek island of Kos and her father from Ioannena's village of Kastaniani.

She is best known for her on camera work as a TV host and fitness celebrity status hosting fitness segments on ANT1 Greek morning show "Proinos Kafes", and co-hosting Star Cafe morning show on Star Channel, as well as host of the first English language ERT show "Hellenic Weekly". Yanna Darili was the Master of Ceremonies for the opening and closing ceremonies of the historical 2004 Athens, Olympic Games.Yanna was also a trailblazer hosting the first travel show about Greece, on Mediterranean Blue, aired on PBS and OTE History Channel. https://givemeastoria.com/2014/12/12/yanna-darilis-taking-world-storm/ https://www.living-postcards.com/meet-greeks/yanna-darilis-tv-host-executive-producer-brand-embassador

As of August 2012, Yanna Darili headed up a private investment group acquiring New Greek TV a Greek-American television station on Time Warner Cable. She has been an on camera talent and serving as the President since the acquisition, securing a partnership and distribution deal with Hellenic Broadcast's ERT World. https://www.ngtv.nyc

Yanna Darili holds multiple degrees including a Bachelor of Science in Film & Television from Empire State University of New York, where she also serving as the Associate Director of the Film & Media Department at New York College campus in athens, Greece, her post graduate degrees in science, include a Master of science, Naturopathic Doctor degree and a PhD in Original Medicine.

https://apnews.com/press-release/ein-presswire-newsmatics/wellness-stephanie-cirami-iaotp-television-queens-03061e0f67ad6e6530860f54b8911464

As an Executive and Creative Producer, Yanna Darili is working on promoting Greece through producing various television series in Greece. https://www.thenationalherald.com/acs-athens-celebrates-80-years-of-excellence-in-education/

Important to note, her birth name in the US is Yanna Darilis, in Greek grammatical case for females it is; Yanna Darili (no s).
