= Grecian Echoes =

Grecian Echoes is a variety show geared to the Greek American community of the Greater Boston area. The show includes both new and old music, community and social event announcements, and news from Greece. It operates six days a week in the mornings on WNTN AM 1550 and is streamed 24 hours on its website.

== History ==
Grecian Echoes was established and began in Boston in the mid-1940s, under the direction of George Panagiotopoulos. Shortly after, he was assisted by John A. Booras. When Panagiotopoulos passed on, John Booras and Orestes Demetriades formed a partnership and continued Grecian Echoes. At the time, the program was aired over WILD, a popular Boston radio station. Throughout the years the program aired over other popular AM and FM Boston radio stations. In the late 1960s John and Orestes made WNTN their radio home. Grecian Echoes continues over the same station and frequency, 1550AM, in Newton Massachusetts. The current show host is Orestes' son Ted Demetriades.

== Grecian Echoes and Greek organizations ==
Grecian Echoes supports the Hellenic Cardiac Fund for Children at Children's Hospital as well as the Hellenic Nursing Home of Canton, Massachusetts with its annual radio telethons. Through their listeners' support and contributions, several million dollars have been raised for both funds.
