= George Marshall (gunner) =

American gunner (1781–1855)

Master Gunner George Marshall

Personal details
- Born: 1781 Rhodes, Ottoman Empire
- Died: August 2, 1855 (aged 72–73) Portsmouth, Virginia, U.S.
- Resting place: Cedar Grove Cemetery
- Spouse: Phillippi Higgs
- Children: Sophia Marshall; Maria J Marshall; Eleanor Elizabeth Marshall; George J. Marshall
- Known for: Pyrotechnic Chemistry; Dye Chemistry; Artillery Education

Military service
- Allegiance: United States
- Branch/service: United States Navy
- Years of service: 1809–1855
- Rank: Master gunner
- Battles/wars: War of 1812

George Marshall (1781 – August 2, 1855) was a chemist, pyrotechnist, artillery specialist, author, educator, and gunner in the United States Navy. He fought in the War of 1812, he was part of Commodore Isaac Chauncey's freshwater fleet on Lake Ontario. He served in the United States Navy with distinction for over forty-six years. He achieved the status of master gunner. He was one of the most important naval gunners in U.S. history. He was a 19th-century American scientist who helped build the framework of U.S. naval gunnery education. He wrote Marshall's Practical Marine Gunnery in 1821.

== Early life ==
George Marshall was born in Rhodes, Ottoman Empire in 1781. By the early 19th century he fled Rhodes and came to the United States. His name was Americanised and American Naval literature lists his origin as Greece as early as 1825 but the country was in the process of fighting for their independence from the Ottoman Empire. Marshall identified himself as a Greek from Greece. He married Phillippi Higgs around 1805, she was from Maryland. Their children included: Sophia, Maria, Eleanor, and George J. He enlisted in the Navy around 1807. He worked at the Washington Navy Yard as a seaman. At the time Thomas Jefferson was president and American hero Sicilian Salvadore Catalano was one of two gunners at the Navy Yard. According to records, Samuel Kelly was the other acting gunner he had one arm. Marshall began his career at the navy yard. Around 1807, Robert Fulton occasionally visited the navy yard to test his torpedo experimentation. The navy yard also conducted advanced cannon research and had a fully functioning steam engine. Catalano was the pilot of the Intrepid during the famous burning of the captured Philadelphia in Tripoli Harbor. America rewarded him for his service. He was invited to join the U.S. Navy. He received the warrant of sailing master and master gunner. Marshall was his student.

== War of 1812 ==
Marshall became a warrant officer on July 15, 1809. His specialization was gunnery. He continued at the Navy Yard from 1807 to 1813. He was with Catalano and Thomas Tingey. Tingey was the commander of the Navy Yard. The War of 1812 depleted the navy yard of resources and officers. The U.S. armed forces took most of the cannons, ships, and experienced officers. Commander Tingey pleaded with the government and warned them that the navy yard had weakened defenses.

Commander Charles G. Ridgely was an American hero who fought with Edward Preble in the First Barbary War. He was looking for glory in the War of 1812. He was assigned to the sloop-of-war Erie. Ridgely's gunners were having a hard time loading the cannons outfitted for his ship. The Washington Navy Yard's gunner was ordered to demonstrate the cannons at Henry Foxall’s Columbia Foundry in Washington. According to the naval contractor, Captain Ridgley's gunners did not know how to properly load and fire the carronade's. Marshall demonstrated the cannons to Captain Ridgley. Captain Ridgley hired Marshall as his Gunner. The Washington Navy Yard's defenses were further disabled with the departure of Gunner Marshall.

The ship was first put to sea around March 1814. The war of 1812 continued and the sloop-of-war Erie was forced to return to Baltimore around April 1814. The British set up a strategic blockade outside of coastal Virginia. The ship berthed at Baltimore and was on standby until early 1815. Captain Ridgeley and his crew were reassigned to the Lake Ontario fleet under Commodore Isaac Chauncey. Ridgeley was in command of the brig Jefferson and Marshall was his gunner.

The crew arrived at Sackett's Harbor in May but the cannons did not arrive until mid-summer. The fleet was delayed but sailed ten days after the Battle of Lundy's Lane. The battle was one of the bloodiest battles of the war. It continued further south of the Niagara River. The battle was now called the Siege of Fort Erie. Marshall and the crew were about to gain experience in warfare. The Jefferson, Sylph, and Oneida blockaded the north entrance of the Niagara River. The remaining fleet sailed for Kingston. The three ships blocked British vessels inside of the river and blocked the entrance preventing British supplies and troops from reaching the Niagara River at the Lake Ontario entrance. During this time Washington was invaded by the British and the city was burned. Tingey and Catalano burned the Washington Navy Yard to prevent the British from taking control.

One month after the blockade the Jefferson and the other ships joined the fleet. The next assignment was to lure Captain James Lucas Yeo into a conflict. The fleet retired in November because the lake froze. By February the war ended. The crew boarded a ship called the Brig Surpize in New York returning to Baltimore. Regrettably, the ship sank outside the coast of New Jersey. Some of the passengers escaped. Marshall and the remaining crew stayed behind. Marshall and two other officers in an act of bravery tied the remaining pieces of the ship together with whatever they could find and they eventually reached the shore. A small number of the crew drowned.

== sloop-of-war Erie (1815-1819) ==
The sloop-of-war sailed to Boston and joined Commodore William Bainbridge's squadron in May 1815. They sailed to the Mediterranean in July. The crew arrived slightly after the Second Barbary War. Marshall and the Erie joined the Mediterranean Squadron. They provided gunboat diplomacy and protected American ships bound for trade in Europe. The squadron sailed between the Strait of Gibraltar and the Strait of Sicily. The warships frequented Italy, Mahón, and the neighboring ports. They did not travel to present Greece because it was restricted and some Ottoman ports required special permission.

On several occasions, the crew of the sloop-of-war participated in small disputes. The tour was dangerous. Marshall and the crew gained experience. The sloop-of-war remained stationed around the Strait of Gibraltar until late 1819. In one incident while they were returning to the United States. The Captain was ordered to pursue a pirate in the Caribbean. Marshall was back in the United States in early 1820. He was reassigned to the Gosport Navy Yard.

== Gosport Navy Yard (1821-1824) ==
George Marshall gained experience as a Gunner. Marshall was reassigned to Gosport Navy Yard Portsmouth, VA in January 1821. The Washington Navy Yard was burned during the War of 1812. The Gosport Navy Yard was protected under the command of Commodore John Cassin. The yard was in a crucial location due to the British blockade of the Chesapeake. The U.S. Government enhanced its defenses. According to the 1821 naval rule book, special marines were dispatched to guard U.S. Navy Yards. Marshall was assigned to the crucial location. Captain Arthur Sinclair began his school for midshipmen and Captain William M. Crane was on board a ship in ordinary and Captain Lewis Warrington replaced Commodore John Cassin as the commander.

Around 1821, Marshall published Marshall's Practical Marine Gunnery. Captain's Warrington, Sinclair, and Crane endorsed his book and recommended it for junior officers. The book was part of the curriculum in Sinclair's school for midshipmen. It was an early scientific book featuring chemistry, physics, and the task of the gunner. It defined U.S. gunnery education in the 19th century. The book described details about the necessary equipment for different types of cannons and pistols. It featured certificate templates that the gunner needed to fill out for each different task. The book had a time management table. According to Marshall, it would take one man 37 days to complete a cannon for service. Most of the tasks listed took one day. It took one day for one man to pack 100 blank cartridges or fix 4 skyrockets. The book outlined an early record of the chemical composition of rockets and practical chemical mixtures.

The book had over 50 different chemical ingredients for pyrotechnics. It described how to mix the chemical compounds. The book also featured the chemical ingredients that produced smoke bombs, phosphorus of lime, alum Phosphorus and a technique to shoot fire at buildings and structures, historically known as Greek fire. The chemistry portion also included how to deal with metallic compounds such as Gold, Silver, Tin, and Iron. Furthermore, the section listed the chemical compounds to prove spirits, glue for broken glass, a stain removal formula, and the formula to dye hammock fabric.

The textbook also featured an equation dealing with projectile motion. The book detailed the distance of a shot on a ship based on the sound of the gun, which was found to fly at a rate of 1142 feet in one second. It was the standard of the time. According to Marshall's equation after seeing the flash of a cannon and hearing the blast the gunner would count the seconds until impact. This way a trained ear would know the distance a cannonball traveled based on ear training. The book example outlined a 9-second scenario where the distance the cannon was fired from the gunner was approximately 10,278 feet or 3,426 yards. Below is an example of the equation from the book, x represents the time in seconds.

$y(x) = 1142x$

The equation was an early view of projectile motion. It did not observe the force of gravity or the traditional angle Θ. The technique predated classical and Newtonian mechanics.

== North Carolina 74 (1825-1827) ==
After four years of service at the navy yard and due to his technical expertise he was assigned to the ship of the line North Carolina 74. Around this time Greece was fighting for its independence from the Ottoman Empire. Marshall was in charge of the gunners on board. The gunner's crew was roughly 600-800 men. The crew included: the gunner's mate, quarter gunner, first gunner, second gunner, gunners aids, powder boys, armorer, armorer's mate, gunsmith, and yeoman of the powder room. Before the ship's departure in early 1825 it was boarded by President James Monroe, Secretary of Navy Samuel Southard, Navy Commissioner Charles Morris, and distinguished members of our Congress. The ship featured a library of books numbering 1100.

The North Carolina 74 served in the Mediterranean as flagship to Commodore John Rodgers. Rogers captain was Master Commandant Charles W. Morgan. The ship sailed to the Mediterranean with two notable passengers Estwick Evans and George Bethune English. They were traveling to aid war-torn Greece. The warship traveled all over the Greek islands. Some included Paros, Milos, and Mytilini. Seaman sent letters back from the ship and they were published in American newspapers. Many of the seamen sympathized with the Greek cause. In one account a Greek commander boarded the North Carolina and was overwhelmed by the massive ship.

The Mediterranean Squadron was celebrating the Fourth of July in the summer of 1826 off of the island of Tenedos. A large Ottoman Fleet approached their position and they eventually began to communicate. Recall most of the Ottoman ports were restricted until the Greek War of Independence. Commander John Rodgers had a historic meeting with the Kapudan Pasha. The Kapudan was the highest-ranking naval officer in the Ottoman Navy. Rogers and the Pasha met in Mytilini where they began trade talks. Eventually, around the time, Greece was recognized as a country American ships were allowed in Ottoman Ports under the Ottoman-American Treaty. Many refugees came to the United States namely: George Siran, John Celivergos Zachos, Gregory Anthony Perdicaris, Christophoros Plato Castanes, and Evangelinos Apostolides Sophocles. Americans began to witness the horrors of Greek slavery. This was used by American abolitionists. A notable Greek slave was Garafilia Mohalbi.

== Later life ==
Marshall was back with his wife Phillippi and his four children. His son George J Marshall was around 2 years old. He was reassigned to the Washington Navy Yard (1827-1832). Marshall was reunited with Commander Tingey and his Mentor Sicilian Salvadore Catalano. Marshall was the gunner of the navy yard. Catalano was in the Ordnance Department at the yard. Marshall and Catalano were both training gunners at the navy yard. Commander Thomas Tingey died and American hero Captain Isaac Hull replaced him.

Two years later, Marshall was reassigned to the Gosport Navy Yard. Marshall met a young man named George Sirian he was also Greek from the island Psara. In 1835, Marshall's eldest daughter Sophia married Samuel G. City. He was also a gunner in the U.S. Navy. His son George J. began his training along with George Sirian. Both of the young men received warrants as gunners and were in command of gunnery on naval ships as teenagers. Marshall began to accumulate a family of gunners.

By 1840, George Sirian married his third daughter Eleanor Elizabeth Marshall. One year later, the U.S. Navy promoted Marshall to Master Gunner. It was the highest rank a gunner could obtain. Around this time Sirian was assigned to the Washington Navy Yard with Marshall's mentor Master Gunner Salvador Catalano. He trained with him. Recall, Captain William M. Crane endorsed Marshall's book. He invited Master Gunner Marshall to the Bureau of Ordnance and Hydrography (1842–1862) Crane was the commander. The Bureau was located at the navy yard. Marshall was also the gunner of the yard. His son-in-law Samuel G. City was in the gunner's loft with him.

Catalano died serving the U.S. Navy at 79 years old at Washington Navy Yard. Marshall resigned from the navy four months later in 1846. Records indicate his resignation was rescinded as soon as the resignation was tendered. His circle of captains and bureaucratic officials did not allow him to resign due to his hi-level of expertise in the science of gunnery. Marshall was reassigned to Washington Navy Yard from 1847 to 1848. Greek American U.S. Navy Chaplain and American Abolitionist Photius Fisk was stationed at the navy yard around the same period. Marshall's son George J. and son-in-law George Sirian both participated in the Mexican-American War. Sadly, while on the sloop John Adams his son G.J. Marshall died of yellow fever.

Marshall returned to Gosport in 1849, Lewis Warrington was now chief of Bureau of Ordnance and Hydrography (1842–1862). Recall, he also endorsed Marshall's book and he was his commander for many years. In 1851, Four-Star Admiral David Farragut and Marshall each planted an oak tree outside of the commandant's office at the Gosport Navy Yard. The commander was Rear Admiral Silas H. Stringham. Gosport Navy Yard was struck by yellow fever in 1855. Marshall died at the naval hospital on August 2, 1855. His sister-in-law died four days later. The name of the navy yard was changed to Norfolk Navy Yard and is now one of the largest shipyards in the world specializing in repairing, overhauling, and modernizing ships and submarines. Norfolk Naval shipyard is the oldest and largest industrial facility that belongs to the U.S. Navy.

== Legacy ==
- George Sirian his son-in-law and student was also a gunner. The George Sirian Meritorious Service Award is named after him.

== Literary works ==
- Marshall's Practical Marine Gunnery 1822

== See also ==
- George Colvocoresses
- Garafilia Mohalbi
- George Sirian
- George Partridge Colvocoresses
- Photius Fisk

== Bibliography ==
- Andrianis, Demetrios Constantinos (2021). Master Gunner George Marshall U.S.N. (PDF). Digital Academic Research Archives.
- Descendants of George Sirian (August 26, 2015). "George Marshall, Gunner, USN (1782-1855)". georgesirian.com. Archived from the original on May 21, 2021.
- Hibben, Henry B. (1890). Navy Yard, Washington History From Organization, 1799 to Present Date. Washington DC: U.S. Government Printing Office.
- Marshall, George (1822). Marshall's Practical Marine Gunnery. Norfolk VA: C. Hall. p. 74.
