= Bloodgood Cutter =

Farmer poet (1817-1906)

- Born: Bloodgood Haviland Cutter; August 5, 1817; Great Neck, New York, U.S.
- Died: 1906
- Occupations: Farmer; poet; landowner; investor
- Spouse: Emeline Allen (m. 1840; died 1881)
- Writing career
- Language: English
- Notable work: The Long Island Farmer's Poems

Bloodgood Haviland Cutter (1817–1906), popularly known as the "Long Island Farmer Poet," was a prominent and colorful figure in late 19th century Long Island, New York.

== Biography ==
=== Early life ===
Cutter was born August 5, 1817, the son of Mary Bloodgood Haviland and Richard Cutter. He was raised primarily by his stepfather's uncle, Roe Haviland (who Cutter referred to as "Grandfather Haviland"), and left school at sixteen to work on one of Roe's schooners, continuing his own education through reading the Bible.

In 1840 he eloped with Emeline Allen, a member of the well-propertied Allen family of Great Neck, NY. He later acquired the Allen mill, which thereafter was called Cutter's Mill (and after which Cutter Mill Road in Great Neck is named). His main occupation was farming, but Cutter was also a propertied landowner, eventually acquiring numerous parcels in Great Neck as well as large blocks of land north of the railroad station there, and across Manhasset Bay in what is now Plandome Heights, where he lived in a twenty-room home towards the end of his life. During the course of his business dealings he developed a reputation for honesty and sound business acumen.

=== Poetry ===
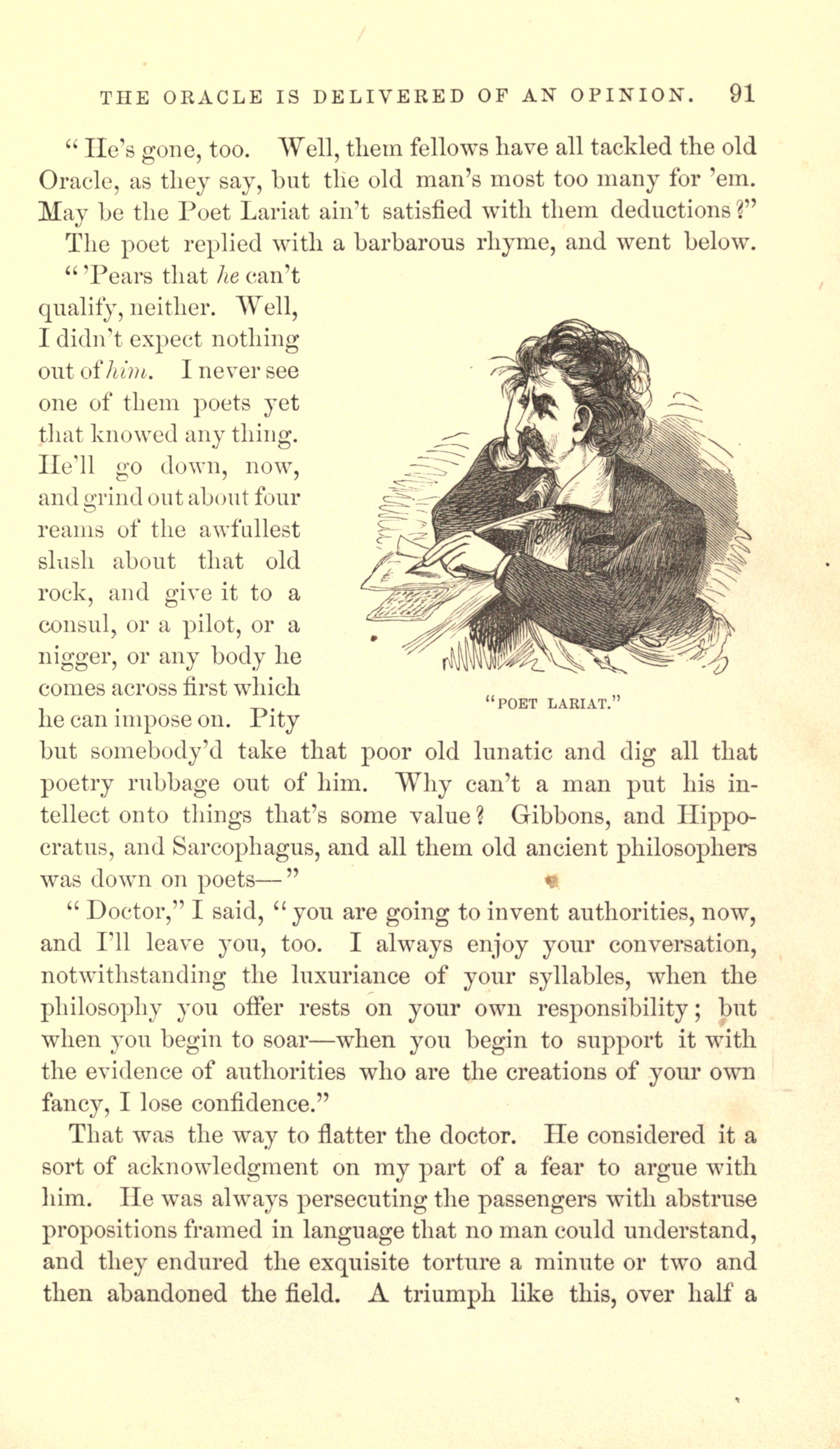
Illustration of the "Poet Lariat" in The Innocents Abroad, p. 091

Cutter also developed a reputation as a "character" for his old-fashioned clothes, his country accent, and the poetry that he wrote and distributed for various events. A stanza of a poem Cutter wrote for the second centennial anniversary of Glen Cove, Long Island reads:

"Oysters and clams grow on your shore,
You have them brought fresh to your door;
Then they are a delicious treat;
But canned they're hardly fit to eat."

In 1867 Cutter booked passage for a five-month trip aboard the Quaker City. Mark Twain turned out to be one of the other passengers, and Cutter found himself immortalized in Twain's book Innocents Abroad as the character the "Poet Lariat." This is how Mark Twain described Cutter in his notes for the book:

"He is fifty years old, and small of his age. He dresses in homespun, and is a simple-minded, honest, old-fashioned farmer, with a strange proclivity for writing rhymes. He writes them on all possible subjects, and gets them printed on slips of paper, with his portrait at the head. These he will give to any man that comes along, whether he has anything against him or not..."

In 1886 Cutter self-published a collection of his poems titled The Long Island Farmer's Poems, which included an autographed picture of Mark Twain as well as a mention of being Twain's Poet Lariat on the title page.

=== Death ===
Cutter died in 1906 at the age of 89. A tall granite gravestone marks his burial site in the cemetery of the Zion Episcopal Church in Douglaston, Queens, to which he had once made a sizable donation. His residuary estate, valued at nearly $500,000, was willed to the American Bible Society. His vast collection of books, antiques, art, travel mementoes and various other items (including "as hot a bunch of waistcoats as ever appeared on Broadway") was sold at auction.

== Publications ==
- "Poetical lecture, suggested after seeing the model of Solomon's temple." L.I. Times Office, 1860. 20 pages.
- "Long Island farmer on congressmen." Little Neck, N.Y., 1860. 1 page.
- "Long Island farmer, musing on a wheel-barrow, while waiting for his neighbor to turn out." Little Neck, N.Y., 1861. 1 page.
- "Eulogy on General Scott." Little Neck, L.I., 1861. 8 pages.
- "A poem on the New England kitchen." Little Neck, L.I., 1864. 8 pages.
- "Long Island farmer to the memory of John A. Van Nostrand, known as "Jack," in Mark Twain's Innocents' abroad." Little Neck, N.Y., 1879. 1 page.
- "Lines on the Egyptian obelisk 'Cleopatra's Needle.'" Flushing, N.Y., W. R. Burling, Printer, 1881. 8 pages.
- "The Long Island farmer's poems: lines written on the "Quaker City" excursion to Palestine, and other poems." New York, N. Tibbals & sons (published for the author). 1886. 499 pages.
- "Long Island farmer on the burning of his mill, on the morning of December, and its history." Little Neck, N.Y., 1889. 1 page.
- "Poems." Berkeley, Calif. Hart Press, 1948. 1 page.
