= Plandome Heights, New York =

- Village
- Incorporated Village of Plandome Heights
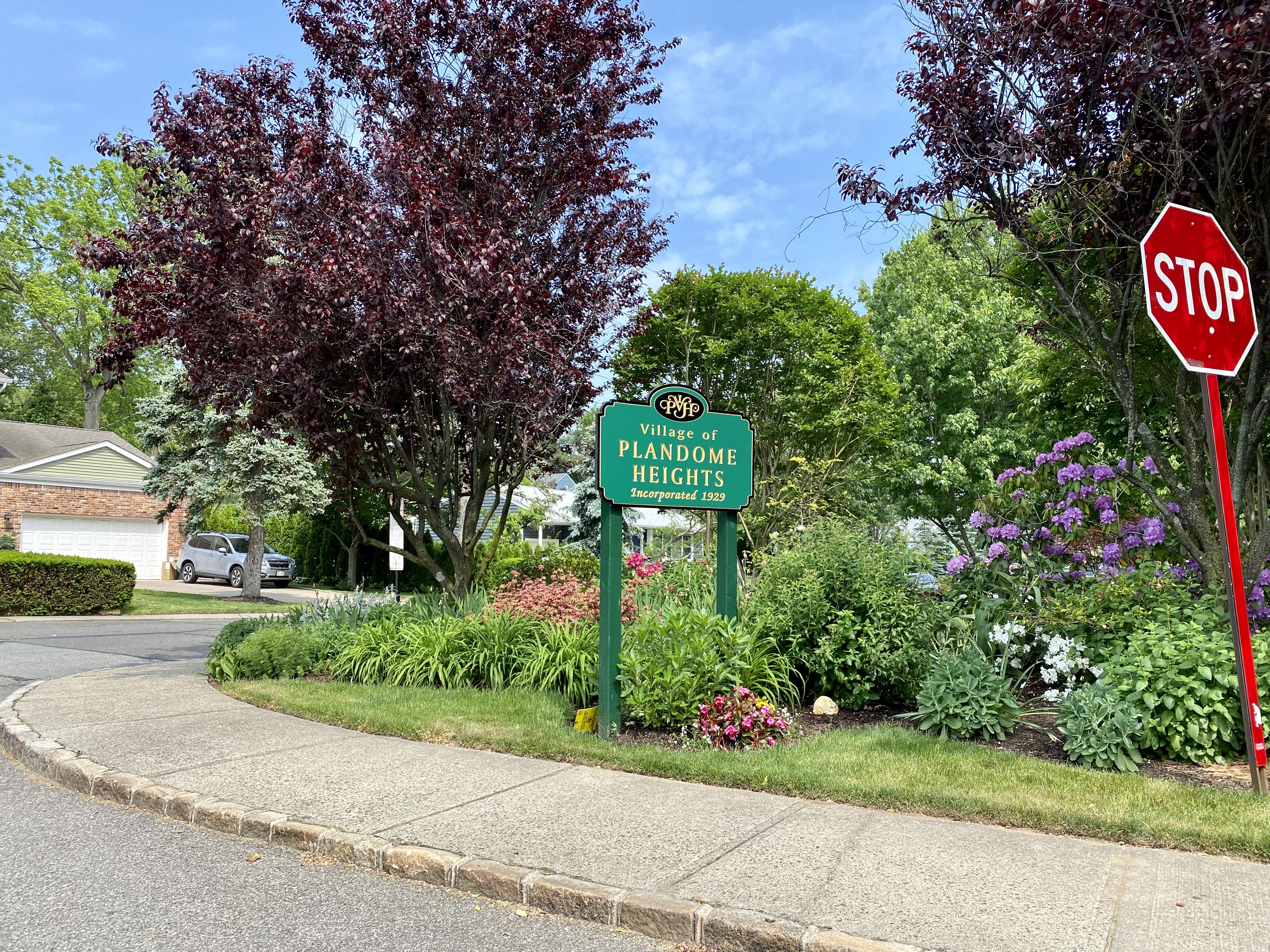
- A welcome sign to Plandome Heights on Webster Avenue, as seen on May 26, 2021.

- Location in Nassau County and the state of New York

- Location on Long Island Location within the state of New York
- Coordinates: 40°48′5″N 73°42′17″W
- Country: United States
- State: New York
- County: Nassau
- Town: North Hempstead
- Incorporated: June 11, 1929
- Named for: Latin phrase "Planus Domus," meaning plain, or level home

Government
  - Mayor: Kenneth C. Riscica

Area
  - Total: 0.19 sq mi (0.49 km^{2})
  - Land: 0.18 sq mi (0.47 km^{2})
  - Water: 0.0077 sq mi (0.02 km^{2})
- Elevation: 89 ft (27 m)

Population (2020)
  - Total: 1,009
  - Density: 5,582.4/sq mi (2,155.37/km^{2})
- Time zone: UTC-5 (Eastern (EST))
  - Summer (DST): UTC-4 (EDT)
- ZIP Code: 11030 (Plandome)
- Area codes: 516, 363
- FIPS code: 36-58486
- GNIS feature ID: 0960669
- Website: www.plandomeheights-ny.gov

Plandome Heights is a village in Nassau County, on the North Shore of Long Island, in New York, United States. It is considered part of the Greater Manhasset area, which is anchored by Manhasset. The population was 1,009 at the time of the 2020 census.

The Incorporated Village of Plandome Heights is located entirely within the Town of North Hempstead and is the southernmost of the three Plandomes.

== History ==
In the early 20th century, Benjamin N. Duke of the Duke tobacco family developed large parts of what is now Plandome Heights through the Plandome Heights Company, which was one of Duke's real estate ventures; many of these homes were built in the Spanish style, which was a popular architectural style at the time. The Duke family owned large portions of Plandome Heights in the early 20th century.

Prior to incorporating, the residents in the original part of Plandome Heights (the western and central portions) had unsuccessfully petitioned for neighboring Plandome to annex their area. This resulted in residents deciding to incorporate following Plandome's refusal, and Plandome Heights officially became a village on June 11, 1929.

In 1949, Plandome Heights annexed an area adjacent to and immediately east of the village, called Chester Hill; this area is at the southeastern end of Plandome Heights, east of Plandome Road, and includes streets such as Chester Drive and Winthrope Road.

Like the villages of Plandome and Plandome Manor to its north, Plandome Heights derives its name from the Latin 'Planus Domus', meaning plain, or level home.

== Geography ==
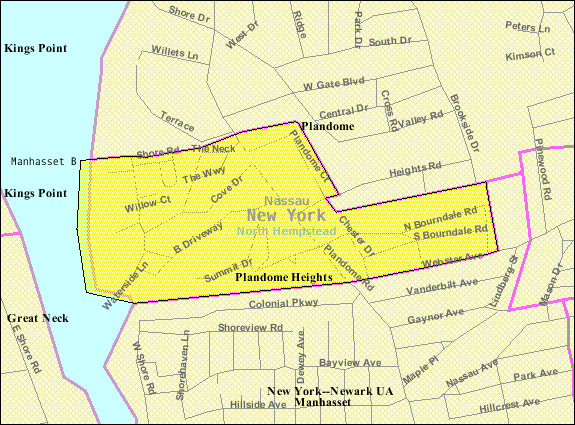
U.S. Census map of Plandome Heights.

According to the United States Census Bureau, the village has a total area of 0.2 square miles (0.52 km^{2}), of which 0.2 square miles (0.52 km^{2}) is land and 5.26% is water.

Plandome Heights is located within the Manhasset Bay Watershed, which in turn is located within the larger Long Island Sound/Atlantic Ocean Watershed.

According to the United States Environmental Protection Agency and the USGS, the highest point in Plandome Heights is located between Chester Drive, South Bourndale Road, Webster Avenue, and Winthrope Road in the Chester Hill section of the village, at roughly 113 feet (34 m), and the lowest point is Manhasset Bay, which is at sea level.

== Demographics ==
Historical population
Census	Pop.	Note	%±
1930	265		—
1940	317		19.6%
1950	882		178.2%
1960	1,025		16.2%
1970	1,032		0.7%
1980	963		−6.7%
1990	852		−11.5%
2000	971		14.0%
2010	1,005		3.5%
2020	1,009		0.4%
U.S. Decennial Census

As of the census of 2000, there were 971 people, 324 households, and 268 families residing in the village. The population density was 5,350.6 inhabitants per square mile (2,065.9/km^{2}). There were 328 housing units at an average density of 1,807.4 per square mile (697.8/km^{2}). The racial makeup of the village was 92.28% White, 0.31% African American, 0.10% Native American, 6.80% Asian, 0.10% Pacific Islander, 0.10% from other races, and 0.31% from two or more races. Hispanic or Latino of any race were 3.09% of the population.

There were 324 households, out of which 42.0% had children under the age of 18 living with them, 72.8% were married couples living together, 7.1% had a female householder with no husband present, and 17.0% were non-families. 15.1% of all households were made up of individuals, and 11.4% had someone living alone who was 65 years of age or older. The average household size was 3.00 and the average family size was 3.33.

In the village, the population was spread out, with 28.6% under the age of 18, 5.0% from 18 to 24, 24.6% from 25 to 44, 27.8% from 45 to 64, and 13.9% who were 65 years of age or older. The median age was 40 years. For every 100 females, there were 91.9 males. For every 100 females age 18 and over, there were 86.8 males.

The median income for a household in the village was $123,199, and the median income for a family was $142,088. Males had a median income of $100,000 versus $46,000 for females. The per capita income for the village was $57,050. About 0.7% of families and 1.5% of the population were below the poverty line, including none of those under age 18 and 5.0% of those age 65 or over.

== Government ==
=== Village government ===
As of April 2024, the Mayor of Plandome Heights is Kenneth C. Riscica and the Village Trustees are Eric Carlson, Daniel Cataldo, Mary Hauck, Kristina Lobosco, Gerald Love, and Norman Taylor.

The following is a list of Plandome Heights' mayors, from 1929 to present:

Mayors of Plandome Heights:
Mayor's name	Year(s) in office
John S. Olney	1929–1931
John F. Isaacs	1931–1945
Gottfried Steigmann	1945–1949
W. Arthur Lee	1949–1953
Charles S. Vaccaro	1953–1960
Richard Wallover	1960–1962
Thomas V. Sheehy	1962–1963
Burton R. Buck	1963–1965
Edward F. Pardee	1965–1968
Ray H. Kremer	1968–1972
H. William Galland	1972–1974
Arthur J. McGee	1974–1980
Thomas N. Clancy	1980–1986
Paula Abate	1986–1988
John F. Keitz	1988–1998
Paula Abate	1998–2002
George Ferman	2002–2003
Sandi Gabriele	2004–2005
Marion Endrizzi	2005–2006
Gene Woo	2006–2008
Diana Merenda	2008–2012
Kenneth C. Riscica	2012–present

=== Representation in higher government ===
==== Town representation ====
Plandome Heights is located in the Town of North Hempstead's 6th district, which as of November 2021 is represented on the Town Board by Mariann Dalimonte (D – Port Washington).

==== Nassau County representation ====
Plandome Heights is located in Nassau County's 9th Legislative district, which as of November 2021 is represented in the Nassau County Legislature by Richard Nicoello (R–New Hyde Park).

==== New York State representation ====
===== New York State Assembly =====
Plandome Heights is located within the New York State Assembly's 16th State Assembly district, which as of November 2021 is represented by Gina L. Sillitti (D–Manorhaven).

===== New York State Senate =====
Plandome Heights is located in the New York State Senate's 7th State Senate district, which as of November 2022 is represented in the New York State Senate by Jack M. Martins (R–Mineola).

==== Federal representation ====
===== United States House of Representatives =====
Plandome Heights is located in New York's 3rd congressional district, which as of February 2024 is represented in the United States House of Representatives by Tom Suozzi (D).

==== United States Senate ====
Like the rest of New York, Plandome Heights is represented in the United States Senate by Charles Schumer (D) and Kirsten Gillibrand (D).

=== Politics ===
In the 2016 U.S. presidential election, the majority of Plandome Heights voters voted for Donald Trump (R).

== Education ==
=== School district ===
The Village of Plandome Heights is located entirely within the boundaries of the Manhasset Union Free School District. As such, all children who reside in Plandome Heights and attend public schools go to Manhasset's schools.

=== Library district ===
Plandome Heights is located entirely within the boundaries of the Manhasset Library District.

== Infrastructure ==
=== Transportation ===
==== Road ====
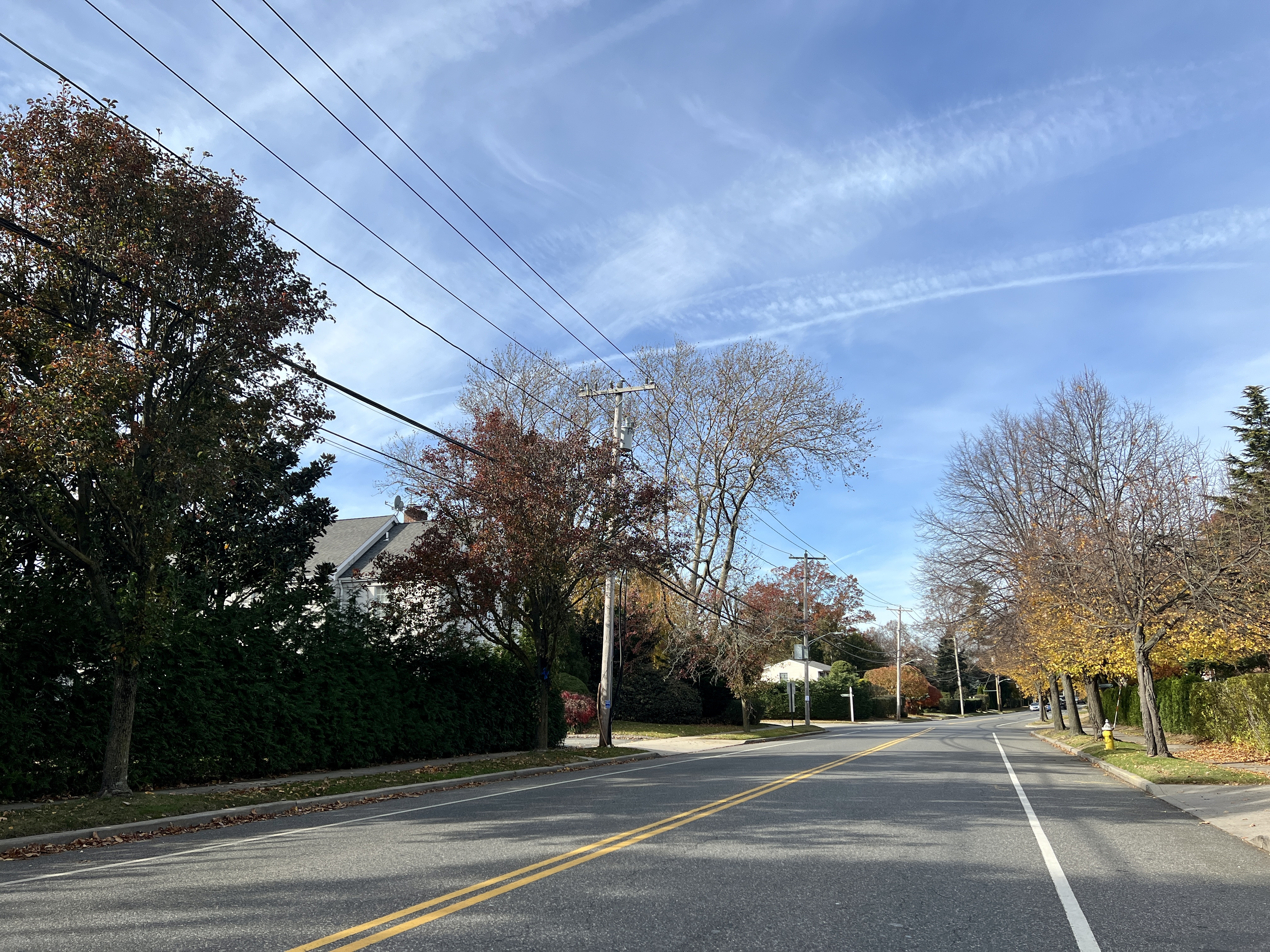
Plandome Road within the village in November 2021.

Major roads in Plandome Heights include Plandome Road and Webster Avenue; the Manhasset–Plandome Heights border runs along the centerline of Webster Avenue west of its intersection with Brookwold Drive.

===== Street layout =====
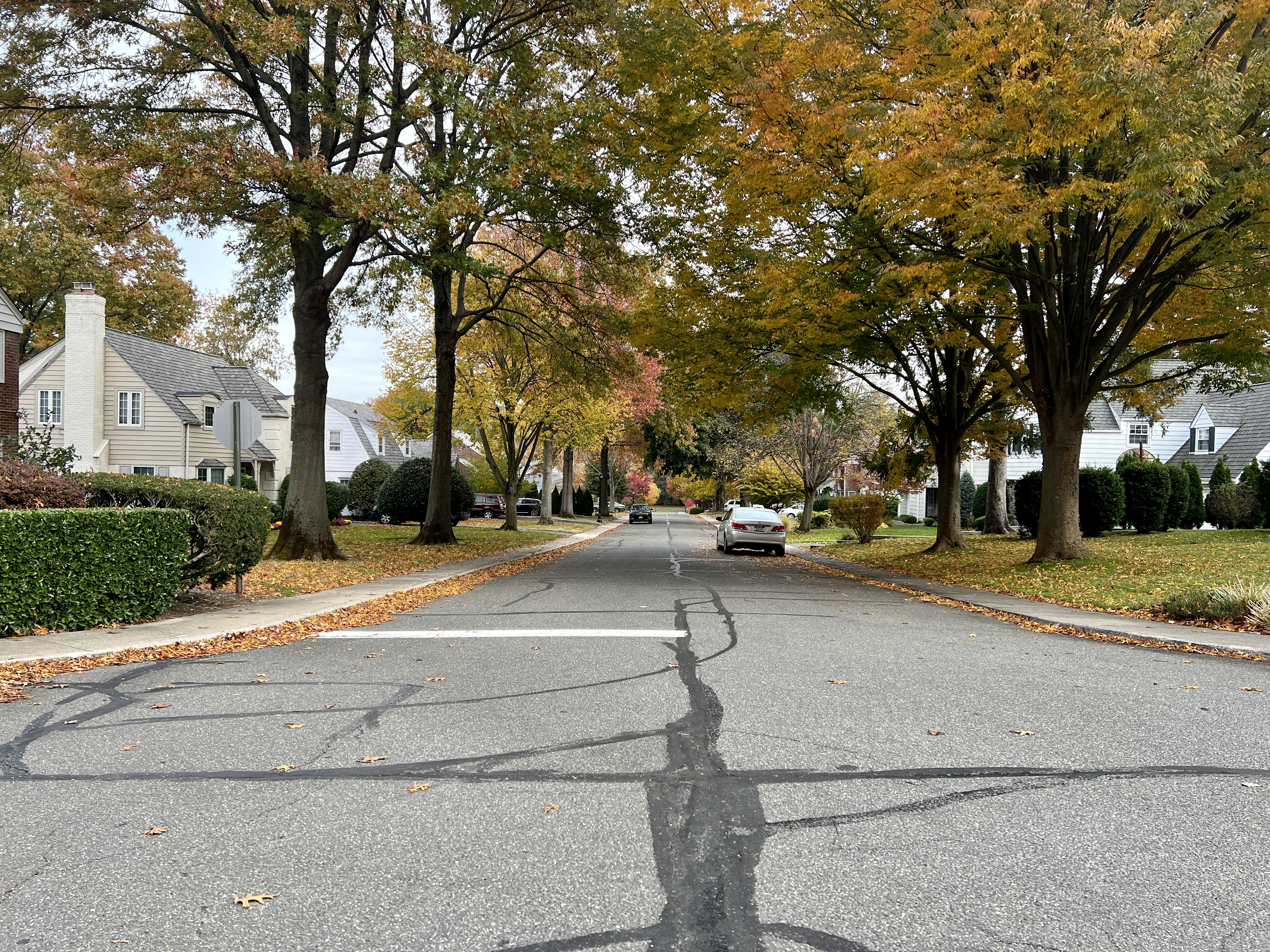
Bournedale Road South in the Chester Hill section of Plandome Heights, typical of the grid pattern in that portion of the village.

Plandome Heights features multiple types of street layouts. The area west of Plandome Road includes several meandering roads and cul-de-sacs, whereas the area east of Plandome Road features a traditional street grid.

==== Rail ====
There are no train stations in Plandome Heights. The nearest Long Island Rail Road station to the village is Manhasset on the Port Washington Branch.

==== Bus ====
No bus routes run through Plandome Heights.

=== Utilities ===
==== Natural gas ====
National Grid USA provides natural gas to homes and businesses that are hooked up to natural gas lines in Plandome Heights.

==== Power ====
PSEG Long Island provides power to all homes and businesses within Plandome Heights.

==== Sewage ====
Plandome Heights is not connected to any sanitary sewer systems. As such, all areas within the village rely on cesspools and septic systems.

==== Trash collection ====
Trash collection services in Plandome Heights are provided by Dejana Industries, under contract with the Village of Plandome Heights.

==== Water ====
Plandome Heights is located within the boundaries of the Manhasset–Lakeville Water District, which provides the entirety of Plandome Heights with water.

== Notable people ==
- Bloodgood Cutter – Landowner, farmer, and poet.
- Albert F. D'Oench – Architect, New York City Superintendent of Buildings, and the husband of Alice Grace D'Oench, the eldest child of W. R. Grace.
- Genesta M. Strong – Politician. Strong was the first female from Nassau County to be elected to the New York State Assembly
