= John H. Starkins =

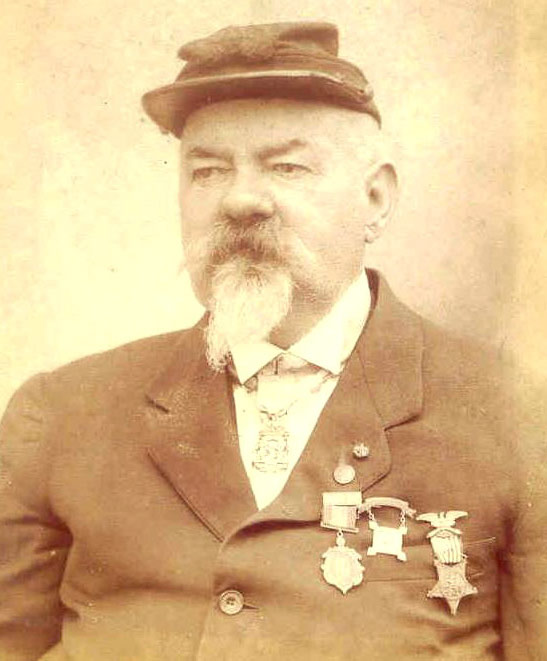
- Born: 1841; Great Neck, New York
- Died: 4 April 1897 (aged 55-56); Flushing, New York
- Burial place: Zion Episcopal Church Cemetery, Douglaston, New York
- Military career
- Allegiance: United States (Union)
- Branch: Army
- Service years: 1861-1865
- Rank: First Sergeant
- Unit: 34th New York Battery
- Conflicts: Battle of Campbell's Station
- Awards: Medal of Honor

John H. Starkins (1841 - 4 April 1897) was a first sergeant of the United States Army who was awarded the Medal of Honor for gallantry during the American Civil War. Starkins was awarded the medal on 30 July 1896 for actions performed at the Battle of Campbell's Station in Tennessee on 16 November 1863.

== Personal life ==
Starkins was born in Great Neck, New York in 1841. He died in Flushing, New York, on 4 April 1897, and was buried in Zion Episcopal Church Cemetery in Douglaston, New York.

== Military service ==
Starkins enlisted in the Army as a blacksmith on 7 October 1861 in Flushing and was assigned to the 34th New York Battery. He was promoted to corporal and then to sergeant but was demoted to private during his first enlistment. He re-enlisted in the Army on November 5, 1863, as a sergeant but was demoted to private again. He was promoted to first sergeant twice, once on 13 November 1864 and once on 1 January 1865. He was mustered out of service on 21 June 1865 at Hart's Island, New York.

On 16 November 1863, during the Battle of Campbell's Station in Tennessee, Starkins maneuvered his artillery piece off the field of battle without taking any casualties. His Medal of Honor citation for this action reads:

The President of the United States of America, in the name of Congress, takes pleasure in presenting the Medal of Honor to Sergeant John H. Starkins, United States Army, for extraordinary heroism on 16 November 1863, while serving with 34th New York Battery, in action at Campbell Station, Tennessee. Sergeant Starkins brought off his piece without losing a man.

— D. S. Lamont, Secretary of War
