= George Sirian =

Greek-American soldier (c.1818–1891)

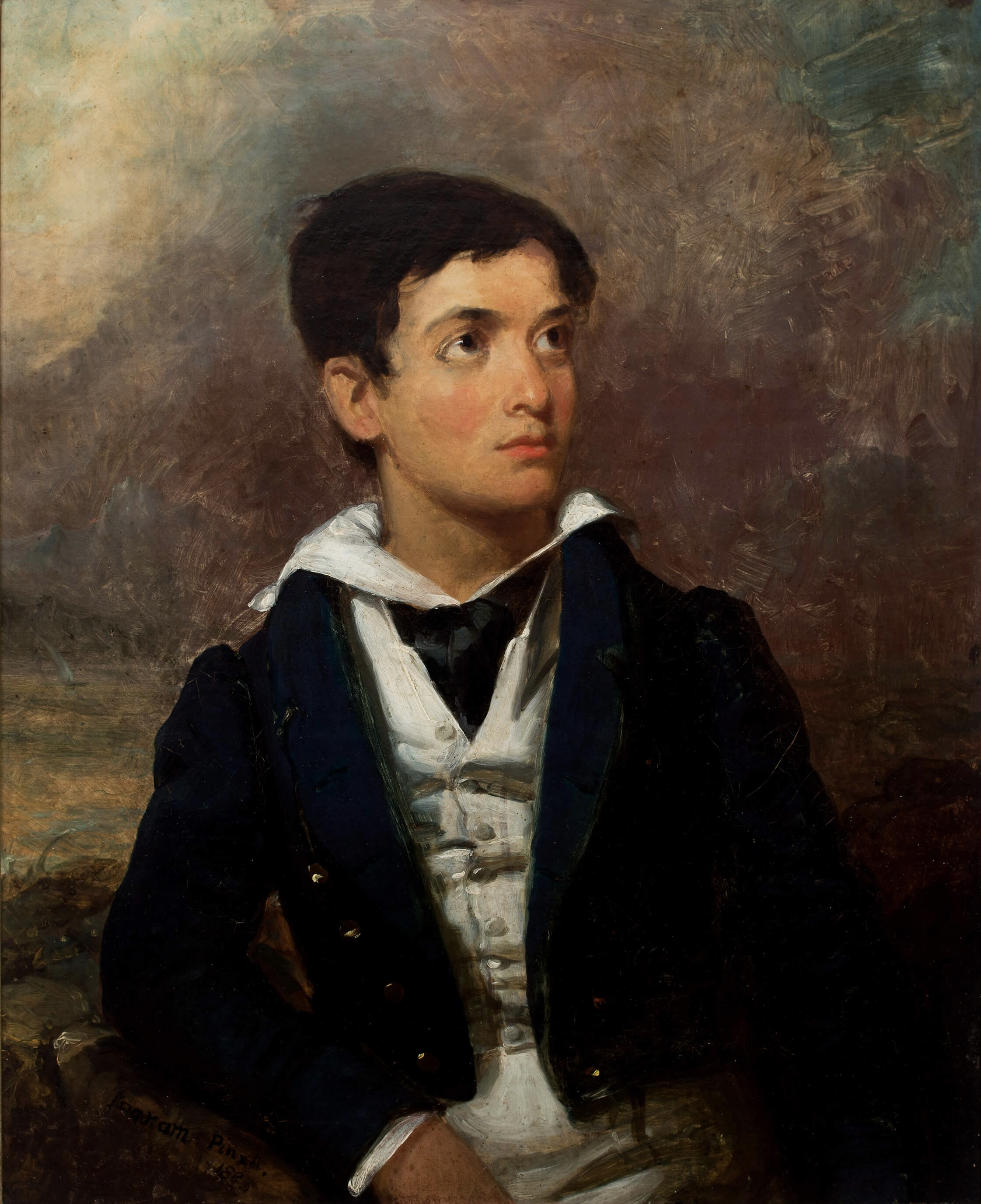
- Portrait by Charles C. Ingham, c. 1828
- Born: c. 1818; Psara, Ottoman Empire
- Died: December 21, 1891 (aged 72–73) Portsmouth, Virginia, U.S.
- Allegiance: United States of America
- Branch: United States Navy
- Service years: 1827–1880
- Rank: Warrant officer
- Conflicts: Mexican–American War; American Civil War
- Spouse: Eleanor Marshall
- Children: 1

George Sirian (c. 1818 – December 21, 1891) was a Greek war orphan brought into the United States aboard the USS Constitution ("Old Ironsides"). He served in the United States Navy with distinction for over fifty years, first as an ordinary seaman, and later as a warrant officer with the rank of Gunner.

== Biography ==
Sirian was born in about 1818 on the Greek island of Psara, then part of the Ottoman Empire. During the Greek War of Independence, at age six, he witnessed the slaughter of his native Greek countrymen at the hands of Ottoman Turks. His mother was able to rescue him by placing him on a boat which was heading out to sea, escaping the onslaught of Ottoman troops, before she was killed herself.

Rescued by United States Navy observers sent there by President James Monroe, the young refugee spent the next three years serving as either a cabin boy or powder monkey. This way the crew was able to keep him aboard with unofficial duties until he was of legal age to enlist in the Navy on his own. In these unofficial positions, Sirian was able to enlist in the Navy a few years later aboard the USS Constitution, which had periodically patrolled the area for years. The ship had been near Chios during the earlier part of the fighting between the Turks and Greeks. Its captain had orders not to interfere in the Greek struggle with the Ottoman Turks and was not allowed to shelter refugees. The only way that Sirian could remain aboard was by joining the Navy.

After about 13 years of service as an enlisted sailor, Sirian was promoted to the warrant officer rank of Gunner on April 20, 1837. During the American Civil War Sirian distinguished himself as a gunnery instructor at the United States Naval Academy. Sirian was the only man to serve aboard the Constitution on three separate tours of duty. One of these tours of duty included Constitution's epic around the world voyage from 1844 to 1846. On July 30, 1872 he was assigned to the steam sloop USS Idaho.

Sirian remained in the United States Navy for 53 years – possibly the second-longest term of enlistment in U.S. history. (The longest-serving enlisted military man was Chief Torpedoman Harry Simmon Morris, who served 55 years on active duty.) He was placed on the retired list on December 15, 1880, at the age of 62. At the time of his retirement, he was the senior ranking gunner in the Navy.

Sirian married George Marshall’s daughter, Eleanor Marshall, in 1840. U.S. Navy Gunner George Marshall was also a Greek refugee who joined the U.S. Navy in 1809. He wrote the definitive guide on U.S. Naval warfare in 1822. George Sirian and Eleanor Marshall had seven children and four survived to adulthood. His oldest son Constantine Ambrose Sirian, became a U.S. Navy chief. Constantine had two sons, he named his one son George Sirian. George worked as a machinist’s mate in the Norfolk Navy Yard in the early 20th century.

Gunner George Sirian died in Portsmouth, Virginia in 1891 at the age of 73.

== Legacy ==
Sirian's technical expertise, dedication, and leadership remain an inspirational model for the chief petty officers of today's Navy. Although, strictly speaking, Sirian was never a chief petty officer as that rate was not created until 1893. The George Sirian Meritorious Service Award, which the Navy awards to those who best exemplify surface warfare excellence, was named in his honor. Naval Museum exhibits about Sirian's life have been shown throughout the country.

== See also ==
- George Colvocoresses
- George Partridge Colvocoresses
