= Evangelinos Apostolides Sophocles =

Greek university professor (1807–1883)

- Ευαγγελινός Αποστολίδης Σοφοκλής
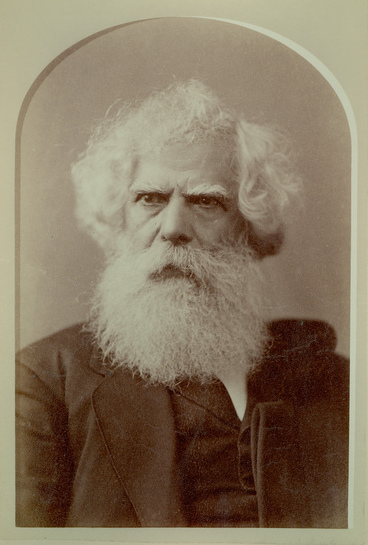
- Born: March 8, 1807; Tsangarada, Thessaly, Ottoman Empire
- Died: December 17, 1883 (aged 76); Cambridge, Massachusetts, US

Academic work
- Discipline: Classicist
- Sub-discipline: Modern Greek
- Institutions: Harvard University

Evangelinos Apostolides Sophocles (Greek: Ευαγγελινός Αποστολίδης Σοφοκλής; March 8, 1807 – December 17, 1883) was a professor of classics and Modern Greek at Harvard University, and lexicographer. He was born in Tsangarada, Thessaly, Ottoman Empire, and he died in Cambridge, Massachusetts. He was a fellow of the American Academy of Arts and Sciences and is considered to be a pioneer of Modern Greek studies.

== Biography ==
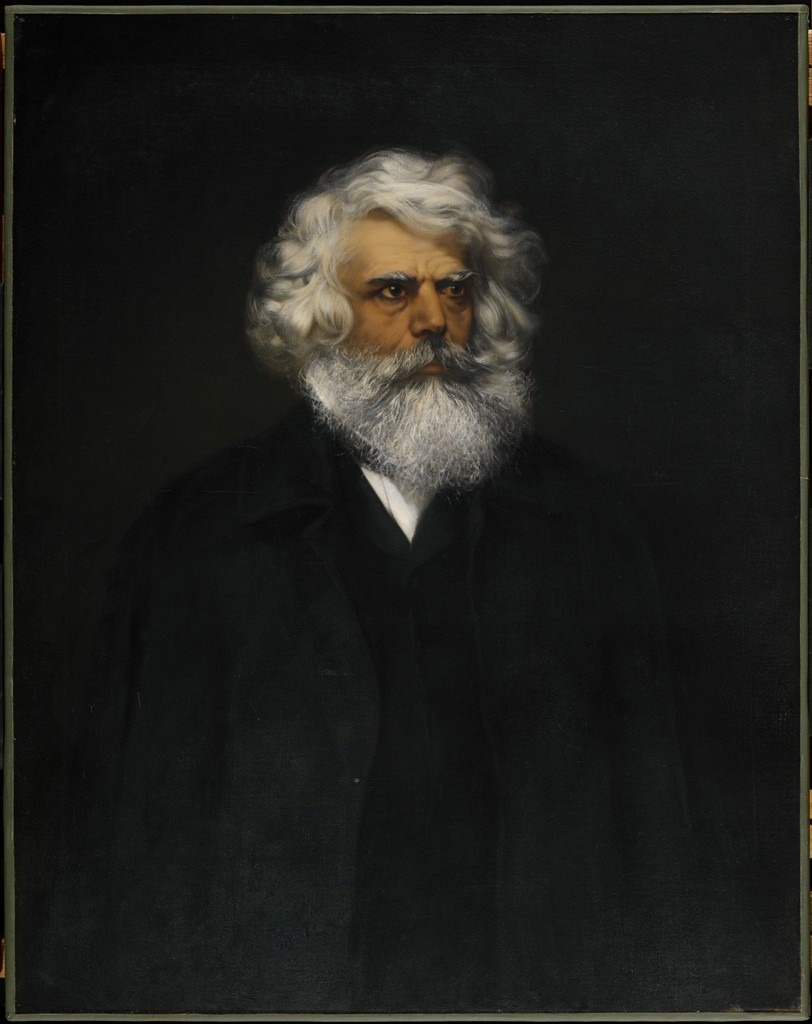
Evangelinus Apostolides Sophocles portrayed by Francis Davis Millet, Harvard Art Museum

Evangelinos Apostolides Sophocles' father's name was Apostolos. The name Sophocles was given to him by his teacher Anthimos Gazis to complement his scholarship; this is the name by which he is commonly known "away from home". At a young age, Evangelinos traveled to Cairo with his uncle. He spent several years there at a metochion of Saint Catherine's Monastery, of which Evangelinos' uncle, the hieromonk Konstantios, was the administrator. Together, they also visited the principal monastery Saint Catherine's Monastery.

Sophocles, now thirteen, returned to the Thessaly region in 1820. He attended school for one year studying Greek classic authors, under the instruction of different reputable scholars, including Anthimos Gazis. The school closed in 1821 because of the Greek Revolution and Sophocles returned to the monastery in Cairo. After several years, he left the monastery due to the death of his uncle. Though he was profoundly shaped by his monastic upbringing, he was never formally tonsured as a monk. Evangelinos reunited with Anthimos Gazis on the Greek island of Syros. On that island, he met American missionary, Reverend Josiah Brewer, a member of the American Board of Foreign Missions, who invited Sophocles to the United States.

Sophocles arrived in Boston, Massachusetts in 1828. He was 21 years old. He studied with Chauncey Colton at Mount Pleasant Classical Institute for one year. Attending the institute were other Greek pupils, such as John Celivergos Zachos and Christophoros Plato Kastanes; Gregory Anthony Perdicaris, one of the instructors, later became professor at various institutions. One year later, Evangelinos was a freshman at Amherst College. Evangelinos did not stay at Amherst for long; he moved to Hartford where he published A Greek Grammar for the Use of Learners and taught mathematics. For a brief period, he lived in New Haven. Around the same period, Alexander Negris published his book A Grammar of the Modern Greek Language, with an Appendix Containing Original Specimens of Prose and Verse. He also briefly lectured at Harvard University. Evangelinos joined the same university.

He became a tutor of Greek at Harvard College in 1842. In 1847, his position became permanent. In 1857, he protested against the faculty's adoption of written final exams by burning his blue books unread. By 1859, he became assistant professor of Greek. One year later, the institution established a special academic position for Sophocles. The courses taught were Ancient Greek, Byzantine Greek, and Modern Greek. Evangelinos continued writing books, prolifically, including his famous Greek Lexicon of the Roman and Byzantine Periods from B. C. 146 to A. D. 1100. The book referenced over 500 authors and was 1187 pages long. He remained at his special position at Harvard until 1883, the time of his death. He was 76 years old.

He was remembered at Harvard as a monastic, eccentric, outwardly cynical, but inwardly soft-hearted scholar. Evangelinos had a total disregard for conventional teaching methods. He loved children and he was devoted to his chickens, which he kept on campus. The professor had profound knowledge of Greek literature. Later in life, he communicated with the monks of Saint Catherine's Monastery on Mount Sinai via telegraph. Throughout his lifetime, he received an honorary A.M. Degree from Yale and Harvard and an LL.D from Western Reserve Academy and Harvard.

== Literary works ==
- A Greek Grammar for the Use of Learners. Hartford, 1835; (Digitized); revised edition as: A Greek Grammar for the Use of Schools and Colleges. Hartford, 1847 (Digitized).
- First Lessons In Greek. Hartford. 1839; H Huntington (cf)
- A Romaic Grammar. Hartford, 1842; (Digitized); revised edition 1860.
- A Catalogue of Greek Verbs for the Use of Colleges. Hartford, 1844; (Digitized).
- Romaic or Modern Greek Grammar. Boston, 1857, (Digitized).
- History of the Greek alphabet with remarks on Greek orthography and pronunciation. George Nichols, Cambridge, 1848, (Digitized).
- History of the Greek Alphabet and Pronunciation. Cambridge, 1848; Second edition, revised. John Bartlett, Cambridge, 1854, (Digitized).
- A Glossary of Later and Byzantine Greek. Cambridge, 1860, (Digitized).
- Greek lexicon of the Roman and Byzantine periods from B. C. 146 to A. D. 1100. Boston, 1870; Charles Scribner's Sons, New York, 1887, (Digitized). Reprinted: Harvard University Press, Cambridge 1914; New York, 1957 in two volumes.

== Bibliography ==
- Burgess, Thomas (1913). Greeks in America: An Account of Their Coming Progress Customs, Living and Aspirations. Sherman, French & Company 1913.

== Sources ==
- Meyer Reinhold's entry in the Rutgers Database of Classical Scholars
- Ancient Greek Wikipedia
- M Paraschos (2011): Boston Greeks, Boston. link including The New York Times (18 December 1883) and The Boston Globe obituaries.
- George C. Soulis, Euaggelinos Apostolides Sophokles (Athens, 1952);
- Albert S. Weston, BDAE, 1218–9; WhAmHS 567.
- Leber, George. History of the Order of AHEPA 1922-1972. Order of AHEPA.
