= Jebala Tribal Confederation =

1890s–1925 warlord state inside Morocco

Jebala Tribal Confederation كونفدرالية جبالة (Arabic)
- 1890s–1925
- Flag

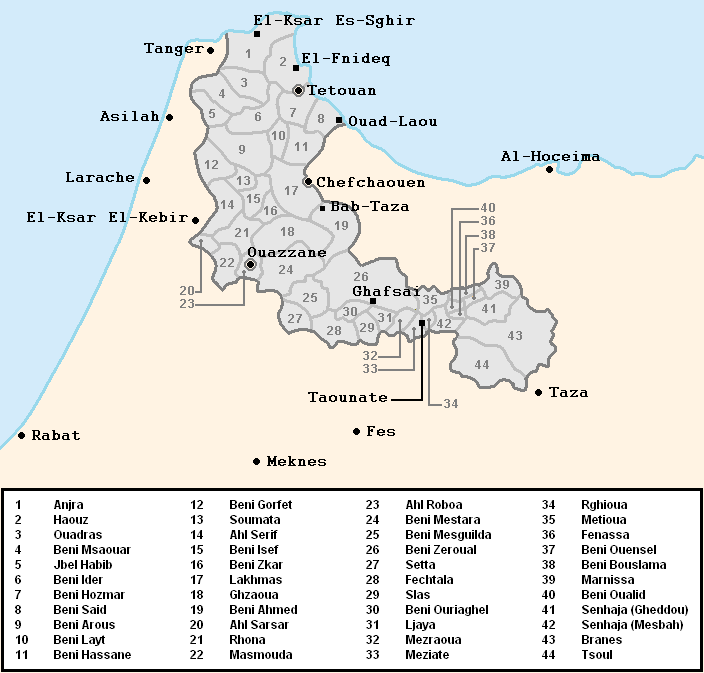
- Map of Jebala
- Status: De-facto independent (until 1922), autonomous (under the Spanish protectorate)
- Common languages: Jebli Arabic
- Religion: Sunni Islam
- Government: Warlord
- Chieftain, Emir, Pasha of Tangiers until 1912
  - 1890s 1925: Mulai Ahmed er Raisuni
- Historical era: Scramble for Africa
  - Established: 1890s
  - Spanish-Moroccan conflicts: 1900s–1920s
  - Perdicaris affair: 18 May – 21 June 1904
  - Rif War: 1921–1925
  - Captured: January 1925
  - Disestablished: 1925
- Currency: Moroccan rial
Preceded by	Succeeded by
Sultanate of Morocco	Spanish Morocco; Republic of the Rif
- Today part of: Morocco

The Jebala Tribal Confederation (Arabic: كونفدرالية جبالة) was a short-lived autonomous tribal state in the Rif and Jebala regions of northern Morocco. It was established and led by the sharif known as Mulai Ahmed er Raisuni (also known as Raisuli). The confederacy was characterized by its fierce resistance to both the Makhzen and the European colonial powers, specifically Restoration Spain and France.

== Background ==
At the turn of the 20th century during the Scramble for Africa, Morocco was divided: one side being controlled by the Sultan, called Bled el-Makhzen, while the majority were part of Bled es-Siba "land of dissidence", where tribal leaders often ignored the authority of Sultan in Fez, which included Jebala.

== Economy and administration ==
Raisuni initially gained notoriety through high-profile kidnappings including the kidnapping of journalist Walter Harri and the infamous Perdicaris incident, and he also kidnapped Caid Maclean ransomed Maclean for £20,000 from the British government (£2,010,000 in 2023). and political leverage.

Unlike the Makhzen, Jebala was decentralized and was a loose alliance held together by Raisuli's personal charisma, religious prestige, and military might. Raisuni fully controlled taxes which was one of the main reasons of how he independently ruled Jebala.

== Decline and fall ==
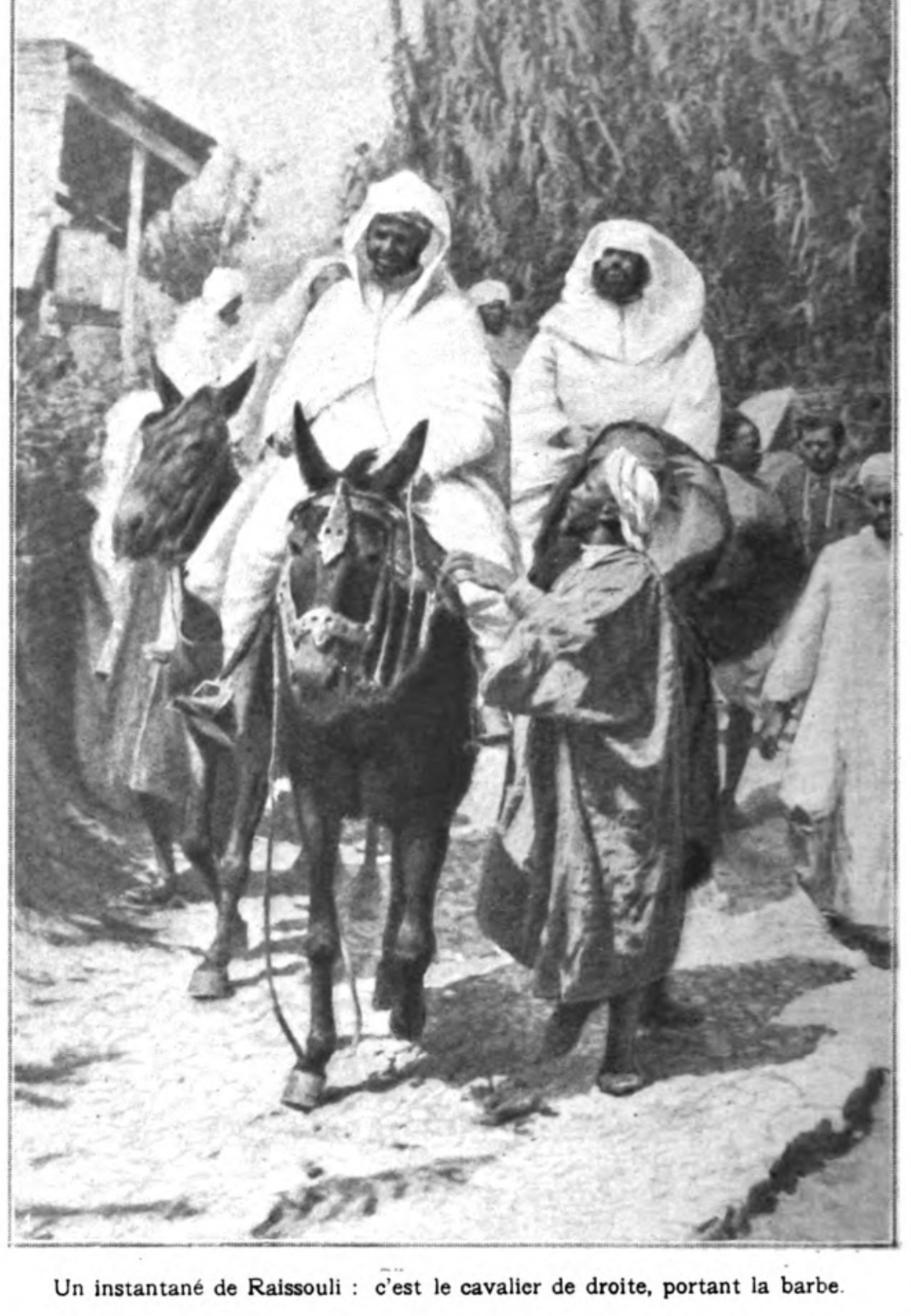
Raisuni (Right) on Horseback

With Tangiers falling into the Spanish Zone, deposing al Raisuni from his position as pasha of Tangiers, Raisuni eventually led several Rif tribes in a bloody revolt against the Spanish, and continued a protracted guerilla war against them. His men were finally defeated by Spanish General Manuel Fernández Silvestre on 3 October 1919 in the Battle of Fondak Pass, although the Spanish failing to capsure Raisuni and most of his troops who managed to escape. In September 1922, and after an interview with Colonel José Villalba Riquelme and permission of the High Commissioner of Spain in Morocco, Ricardo Burguete, he submitted to the Spanish authorities and subsequently joined forces with the Spanish army in the Rif War of the 1920s. This agreement was heavily criticized at the time as Raisuni's forces, heavily weakened by their conflict with Abd el Krim, were seen as on the verge of defeat. Raisuni was intensely jealous of Abd el Krim and his growing popularity amongst the Rifi's hoping to gain control of Western Morocco with a Spanish victory.

He was jailed in Tamasint, where he died by the end of April 1925, after suffering from edema for several years. Rumors of his survival persisted, as Raisuni had been erroneously reported dead in 1914 and 1923. With no one to succeed him, the Confederacy was easily incorporated into the Rif Republic and later Spanish Zone.

== Sources ==
- Porch, Douglas (2005). The Conquest of Morocco (2nd ed.). New York: Farrar, Straus & Giroux. ISBN 978-1-4299-9885-7. - Total pages: 368
