= Abdelaziz of Morocco =

Sultan of Morocco from 1894 to 1908

Abd al-Aziz bin Hassan عبد العزيز بن الحسن
- Amir al-Mu'minin
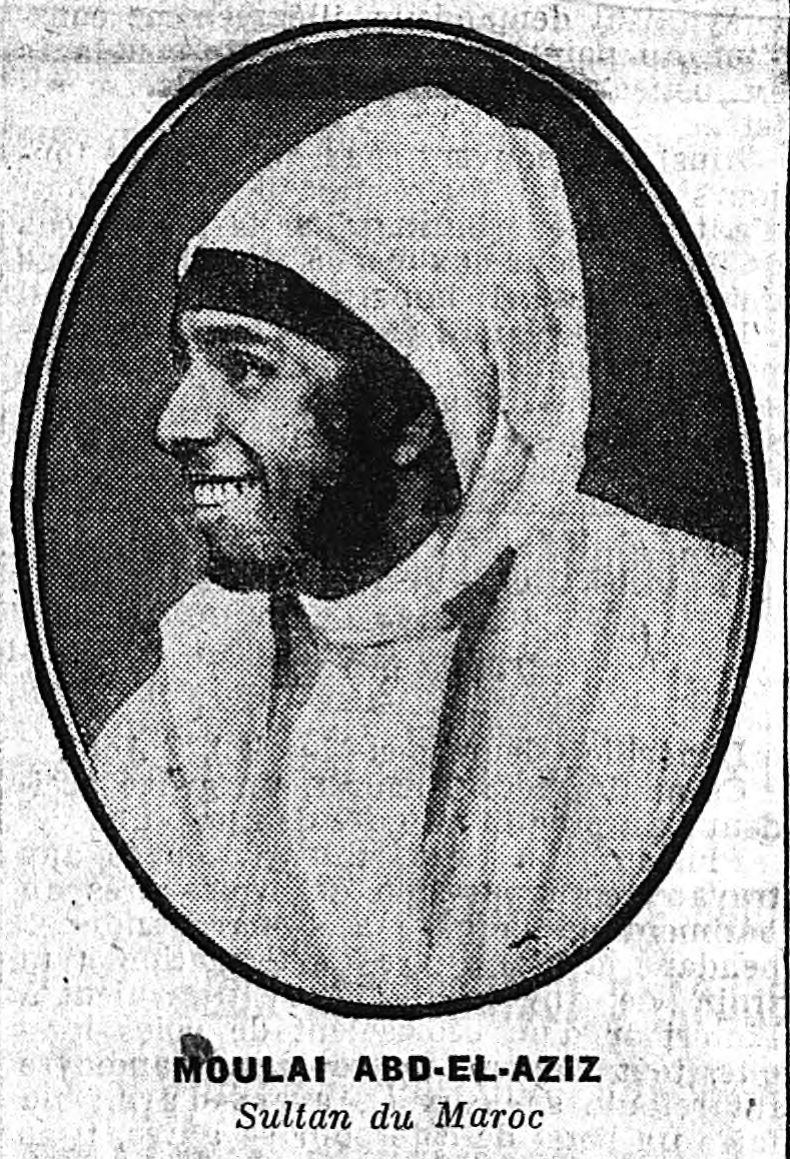
- 1907 picture from an article in Le Petit Journal

Sultan of Morocco
- Reign: 9 June 1894 – 21 August 1908
- Predecessor: Mawlay Hassan I
- Successor: Mawlay Abd al-Hafid
- Regent: Ahmed bin Musa (1894–1900)
- Born: 24 February 1878 or 18 February 1881; Marrakesh, Sultanate of Morocco
- Died: 10 June 1943 (aged 62); Tangier, Tangier International Zone
- Burial: Mawlay Abdallah Mosque, Fes, Morocco
- Wives: Lalla Khadija bint Omar al-Youssi; Lalla Yasmin al-Alaoui
- Issue: Moulay Hassan; Lalla Fatima Zahra
Names
- ʿAbd al-ʿAzīz ibn al-Ḥasan ibn Muḥammad al-Ḥasanī al-ʿAlawī
- House: 'Alawi dynasty
- Father: Hassan bin Mohammed
- Mother: Lalla Ruqaya
- Religion: Maliki Sunni Islam

Moulay Abd al-Aziz bin Hassan (Arabic: عبد العزيز بن الحسن, romanized: ʿAbd al-ʿAzīz ibn al-Ḥasan; 24 February 1878 – 10 June 1943) was sultan of Morocco from 9 June 1894 to 21 August 1908, as a ruler of the 'Alawi dynasty. He was proclaimed sultan at the age of sixteen after the death of his father Hassan I.

Moulay Abdelaziz tried to strengthen the central government by implementing a new tax on agriculture and livestock, a measure which was strongly opposed by sections of the society. This in turn led Abdelaziz to mortgage the customs revenues and to borrow heavily from the French, which was met with widespread revolt and a revolution that deposed him in 1908 in favor of his brother Abd al-Hafid.

== Early life ==
Abdelaziz was born on 24 February 1878 or 18 February 1881 to Hassan I of Morocco and Lalla Ruqaya who was a Circassian concubine who became Hassan's favorite wife.

Shortly before his death in 1894 Hassan I designated Moulay Abdelaziz his heir, despite his young age. Previously, Hassan's other son Moulay Mahammad was the accepted successor of Hassan. However, he was dismissed because he was allegedly a poor commander and half-hearted Muslim. Abdelaziz was chosen over his brothers because he was Hassan's favourite son.

Abdelaziz's education was mostly focused on religious subjects rather than the practice of government affairs. His teachers included a pro-reform scholar from Marrakesh, al-Faqih Mufaddal al-Susi, who would later provide fatwas on the legality of Abdelaziz's proposed reforms. The aspect of his education that had the biggest effect on his rule was his isolation from the people preventing him from understanding what behaviours were appropriate for a sultan to display publicly.

== Reign ==
In academic literature, Abdelaziz's reign is often referred to as the "prelude to Protectorate". Historians both before and after colonialism often write about this period as if the fall of the makhzen was inevitable due to the accumulation of forces preventing reform.

=== Early reign ===
Abdelaziz's accession to the sultanate was ensured with little fighting because of his mother, Lalla Ruqaya, and Ba Ahmed, the chamberlain and grand vizier of Hassan I. Ba Ahmed became regent and for six years showed himself a capable ruler.

In 1895, tribes of southern Morocco rose up in rebellion. At the head of a mahalla with support from the large Mtougga tribe, Abdelaziz marched south and defeated the southern rebels, triumphantly entering Marrakesh in March 1896 with his regent Ahmed, capturing a large booty of horses and camels.

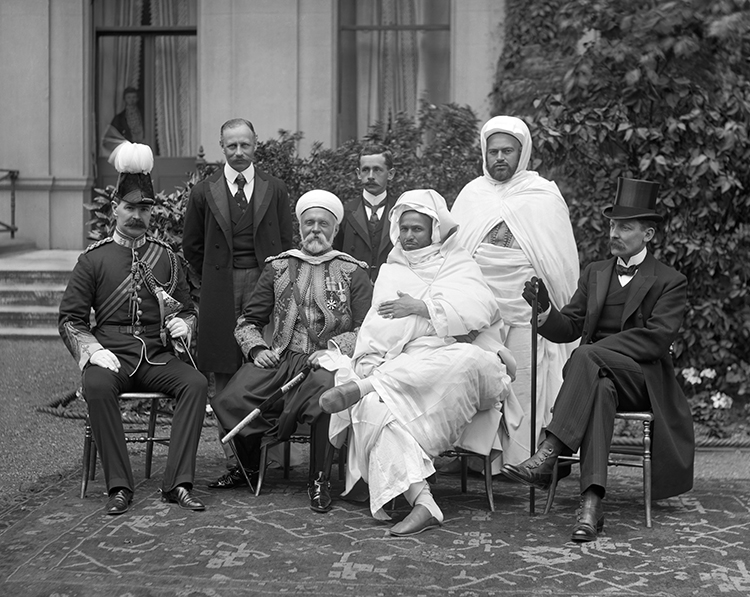
Harry Aubrey de Vere Maclean and Mehdi al-Menebhi in the centre

On his death in 1900 the regency ended, and Abdelaziz took the reins of government into his own hands. The new makhzen appointed by Abdelaziz favoured reform as the best way of preserving Moroccan independence. Originally, a cousin of Ba Ahmed became grand vizier but was replaced by an elderly Andalusian official Muhammad al-Mufaddal ibn Muhammad Gharnit. The minister of foreign affairs, Abd al-Karim ibn Sulayman, who supported refoms, and minister of finance, Abd al-Salam al-Tazi, remained in their positions. The most important figure in government was the royal favourite Mehdi al-Menebhi, an Arab from the south, and young mukhzani of rural origin who became his aide-de-camp and chief adviser. Menebhi like Abdelaziz supported reform and he was given the position of minister of war. Another important figure in this time was the Scottish drill sergeant "Qaid" Harry Aubrey de Vere Maclean who became part of Abdelaziz's inner circle providing him with entertainment and whatever he desired abroad. French diplomat Eugène Aubin described the makhzen as weak and one of "professional politicians, intriguing against one another, adopting different attitudes, and playing on the inexperience of the sovereign".

On the same year, the French administration of Algeria called for the annexation of the Tuat region, which was part of Morocco back then, and owed religious and tributary allegiance to the sultans of Morocco. The territory was annexed by France in 1901. Subsequently, in 1903, France began to expand westwards towards Bechar and Tindouf, defeating the Moroccan forces in the Battle of Taghit and Battle of El-Moungar.

As urged by his mother, the sultan sought advice and counsel from Europe and endeavored to act on it, but advice not motivated by a conflict of interest was difficult to obtain, and in spite of the unquestionable desire of the young ruler to do what was best for the country, wild extravagance both in action and expenditure resulted, leaving the sultan with a depleted exchequer and the confidence of his people impaired. His intimacy with foreigners and his imitation of their ways were sufficient to rouse strong popular opposition.

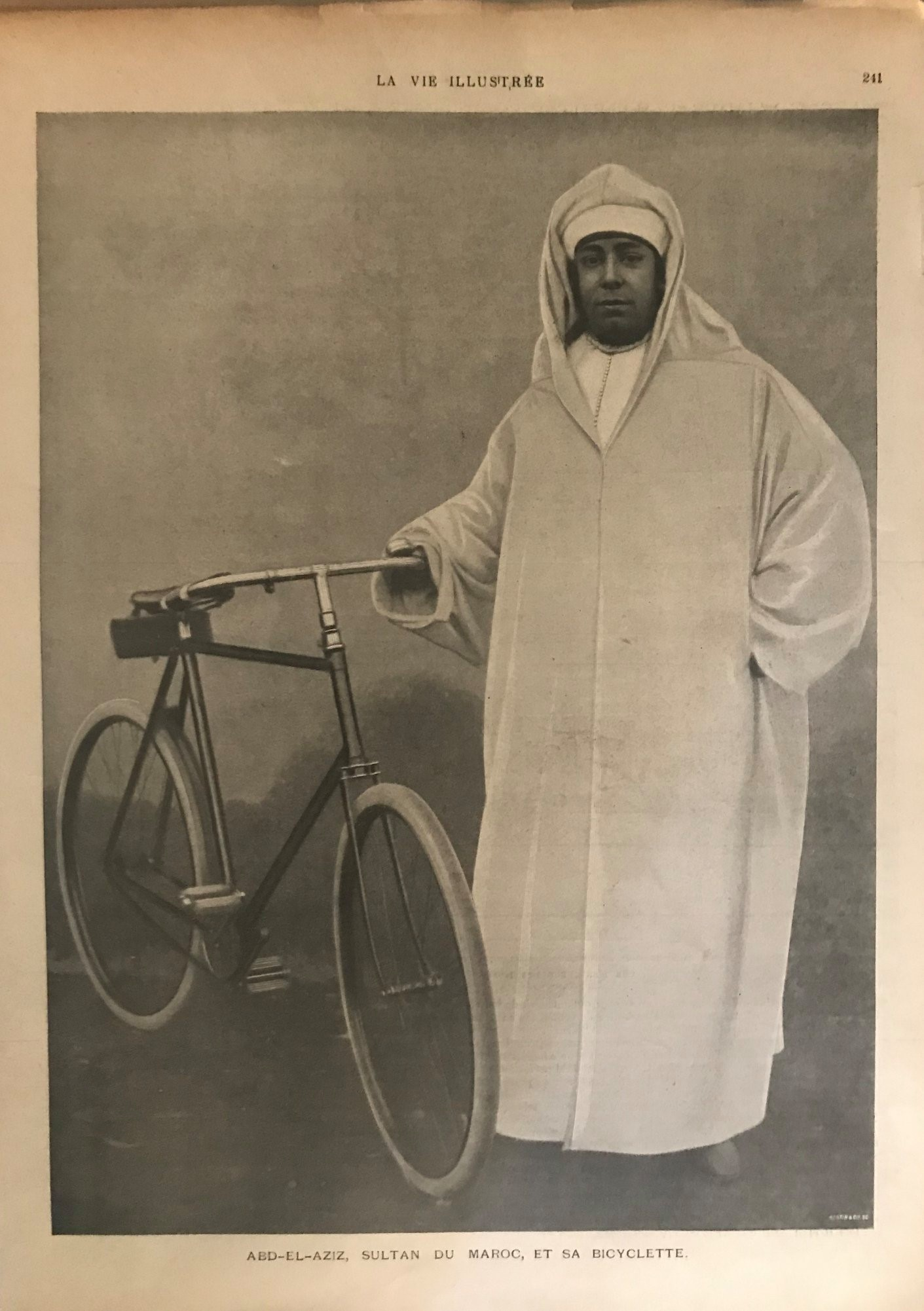
Abdelaziz with his bicycle, published in La Vie illustrée 1901. There have been tall tales of the young sultan having "sold Morocco for a bicycle" that have circulated in popular culture and on social media.

While privately owned printing presses had been allowed since 1872, Abdelaziz passed a dhahīr in 1897 that regulated what could be printed, allowing the qadi of Fes to establish a board to censor publications, and requiring that the judges be notified of any publication, so as to "avoid printing something that is not permitted." According to Moroccan historian Abdallah Laroui, these restrictions limited the volume and variety of Moroccan publications at the turn of the century, and institutions such as al-Qarawiyyin University and Sufi zawiyas became dependent on imported texts from Egypt.

His attempt to reorganize the country's finances by the systematic levy of taxes was hailed with delight, but the government was not strong enough to carry the measures through, and the money which should have been used to pay the taxes was employed to purchase firearms instead. And so the benign intentions of Moulay Abdelaziz were interpreted as weakness, and Europeans were accused of having spoiled the sultan and of being desirous of spoiling the country.

When British engineers were employed to survey the route for a railway between Meknes and Fes, this was reported as indicating the sale of the country outright. The strong opposition of the people was aroused, and a revolt broke out near the Algerian frontier. Such was the state of things when the news of the Anglo-French Agreement of 1904 came as a blow to Abdelaziz, who had relied on England for support and protection against the inroads of France.

=== Foreign policy ===
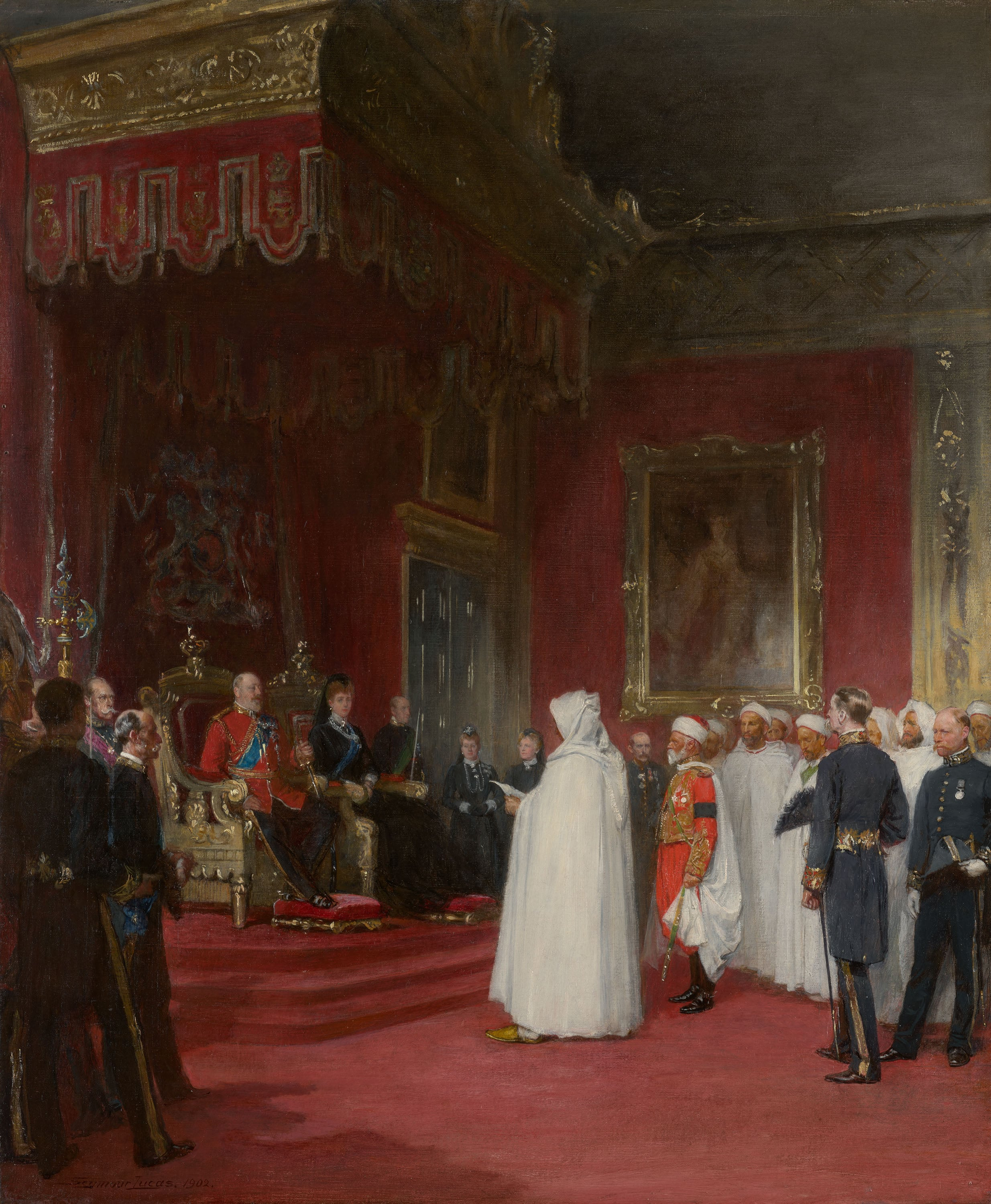
The Reception of the Moorish Ambassador by Edward VII at St James's Palace depicts the newly crowned Edward VII receiving a Moroccan delegation led by Moroccan minister of war Mehdi al-Menebhi.

In order to ensure the success of his reform programme, Abdelaziz sought to mend their diplomatic disputes to as well as obtain French support to inspire British confidence and to gain financial commitments. In June 1901, Abdelaziz sent his minister of war, al-Menebhi, to the United Kingdom and he was received by King Edward VII. Immediately after being sent to the UK, al-Menebhi's mission visited Berlin. The reception was unenthusiastic in both the UK and Germany as the UK was occupied with the Boer War and events in the Far East. Simultaneously, the foreign minister, Abd al-Karim ibn Sulayman, was sent to Paris and St. Petersburg. In Paris, the Ibn Sulayman delegation entered into negotiations over the Morocco-Algerian frontier. Despite an accord being concluded on July 20 which temporarily resolved the situation over the frontier, France did not commit itself to the Moroccan reform programme. This mode of diplomacy where Morocco engaged with multiple European states was designed to maintain the balance of power between these European states.

==== Algeciras Conference ====
On the advice of Germany, Abdelaziz proposed an international conference at Algeciras in 1906 as a result of the First Moroccan Crisis in 1905, to consult upon methods of reform, the sultan's desire being to ensure a state of affairs which would leave foreigners with no excuse to interfere in the control of the country and thereby promote its welfare, which he had earnestly desired from his accession to power. This was not, however, the result achieved, and while on June 18 the sultan nonetheless ratified the resulting Act of the conference, which the country's delegates had found themselves unable to sign, the anarchic state into which Morocco fell during the latter half of 1906 and the beginning of 1907 revealed the young ruler as lacking sufficient strength to command the respect of his turbulent subjects.

The final Act of the Conference, signed on 7 April 1906, covered the organisation of Moroccan police and customs, regulations concerning the repression of the smuggling of armaments and concessions to the European bankers from a new State Bank of Morocco, issuing banknotes backed by gold, with a 40-year term. The new state bank was to act as Morocco's Central Bank, with a strict cap on the spending of the Sherifian Empire, and administrators appointed by the national banks, which guaranteed the loans: the German Empire, United Kingdom, France and Spain. Spanish coinage continued to circulate. The right of Europeans to own land was established, whilst taxes were to be levied towards public works.

=== Opposition ===
==== Rebellion of Bu Hmara ====
Jilali bin Idris al-Yusufi al-Zarhuni, also known as Bu Hmara, emerged in north-east Morocco in 1902. He claimed to be the older brother of Abdelaziz and the rightful heir to the throne. Having spent time in Fes, he had become familiar with Makhzen politics. The pretender established a rival Makhzen in a remote area between Melilla and Oujda. He traded with Europe, collected customs duties, and imported arms. He also granted Europeans mining rights for iron and lead in the Rif Mountains, and he claimed to be the Mahdi. His armies easily defeated those sent by Abdelaziz to capture him and even threatened the capital, Fes, proving the Minister of War al-Manabhi to be an incompetent general. The rebellion continued until Abd al-Hafid, Abdelaziz's successor, defeated and executed Bu Hmara in 1909.

==== Rebellion of Ahmed al-Raysuni ====
Ahmed al-Raysuni, a warlord and leader of the Jibala tribal confederacy, started a rebellion against the sultan of Morocco, which gave other rebels the signal to defy the Makhzen. al-Raysuni built an independent power-center and invaded Tangier in 1903. Raysuni would kidnap Christians, including Greek American Ion Perdicaris, British journalist Walter Burton Harris, and Scottish military instructor Harry Maclean, and ransom them—in open defiance of the Makhzen of Abdelaziz. The Perdicaris Incident in 1904 was one of the most important of these incidents, leading to the involvement of the United States, the United Kingdom, France, and Spain. Raysuni demanded a ransom of $70,000 and six districts from the sultan, in which the sultan eventually complied with. Raysuni supported Abd al-Hafid in taking over the Moroccan throne in the Hafidiya coup in 1908, and continued the rebellion against the later Spanish colonisers, until he was captured and imprisoned in Tamassint by Abd al-Karim in 1925, where died a few months later on the same year.

==== Occupation of Oujda ====
On 19 March 1907, Émile Mauchamp, a French doctor, was assassinated by a mob in Marrakesh who stabbed him. The French press represented the murder as an "unprovoked and random act of barbarous cruelty. Shortly after Mauchamp's death, France took his death as a pretext to occupy Oujda from French Algeria, a Moroccan city on the border with French Algeria, on March 29 supposedly in retribution for the murder.

==== Bombardment of Casablanca ====
In July 1907, tensions rose even higher, when eight Europeans were murdered by tribesmen of the Chaouia—demanding removal of the French officers from the customs house, an immediate halt on the construction of the port, and the destruction of the railroad crossing over the Sidi Belyout cemetery—and incited a riot in Casablanca, calling for jihad. European railroad workers were killed, leading to Casablanca's bombardment by France, in which parts of the city were destroyed, and 1,500 to 7,000 civilians were killed. The French then sent an expeditionary force of 2,000 soldiers to the city, occupying it, and then moved into the plains surrounding the city while fighting the Chaouia in a pacification campaign.

=== Hafidiya ===
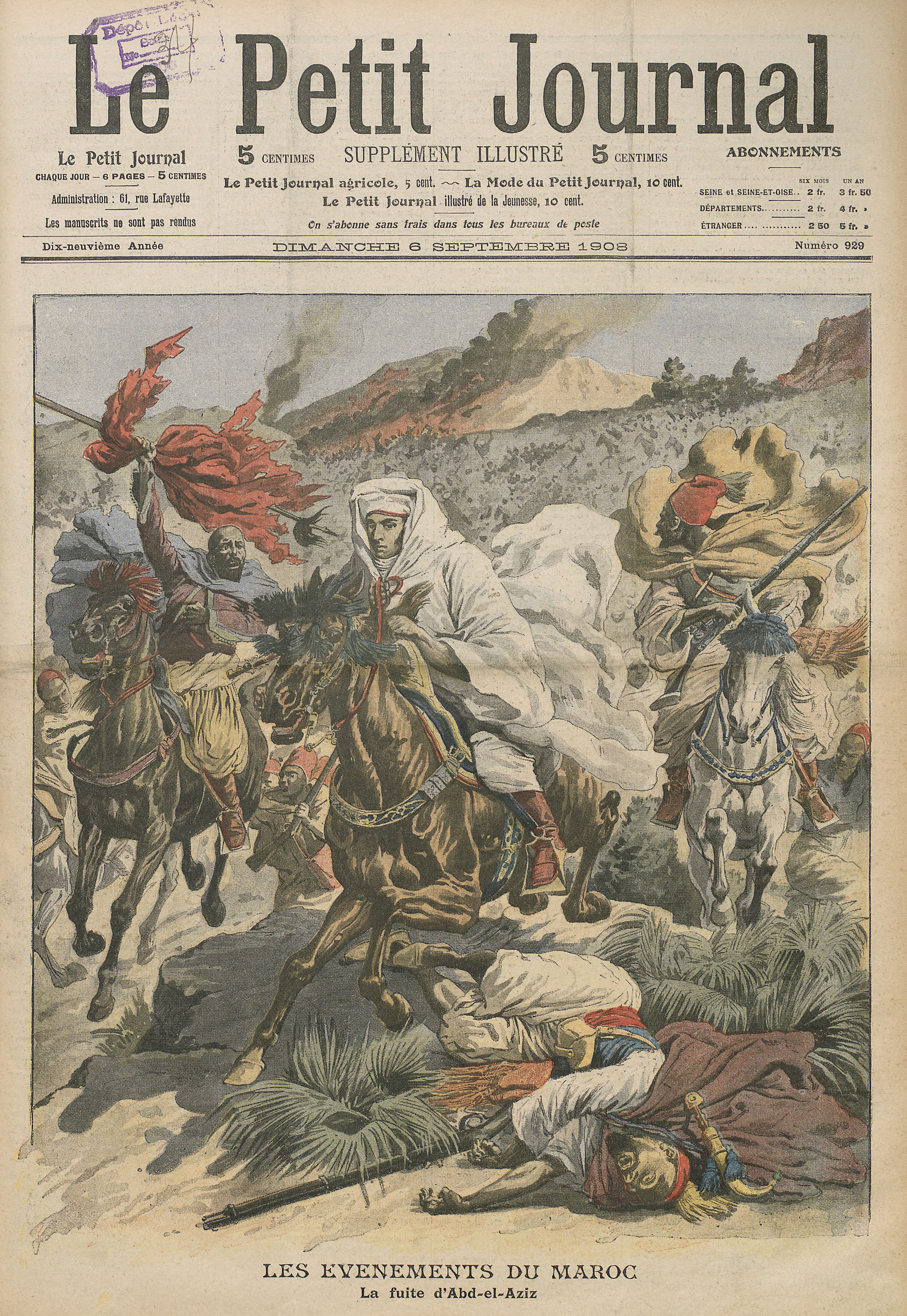
Abdelaziz fleeing Marrakesh after the Battle of Marrakesh of the Hafidiya in 1908 as illustrated in Le Petit Journal.

A few months earlier in May 1907, the southern aristocrats, led by the head of the Glawa tribe Si al-Madani al-Glawi, invited Abd al-Hafid, an elder brother of Abdelaziz, and viceroy of Marrakesh, to become sultan, and the following August Abd al-Hafid was proclaimed sovereign there with all the usual formalities. In September 1907, Abd al-Hafid gained the Bay'ah from Marrakesh, and in January 1908, the Ulama of Fes issued a "conditional" Bay'ah in support of Abd al-Hafid. The Bay'ah demanded that Abd al-Hafid abolishes gate taxes, liberates the French-occupied cities of Oujda and Casablanca, and confines Europeans to port cities. Soon after, Abdelaziz arrived at Rabat from Fes and endeavored to secure the support of the European powers against his brother. After months of inactivity Abdelaziz made an effort to restore his authority, and quitting Rabat in July he marched on Marrakesh. His force, largely owing to treachery, was completely overthrown on August 19 when nearing that city, and was defeated in the Battle of Marrakesh. Abdelaziz fled to Settat, within the French lines around Casablanca, where he announced his abdication two days later.

=== End of rule ===
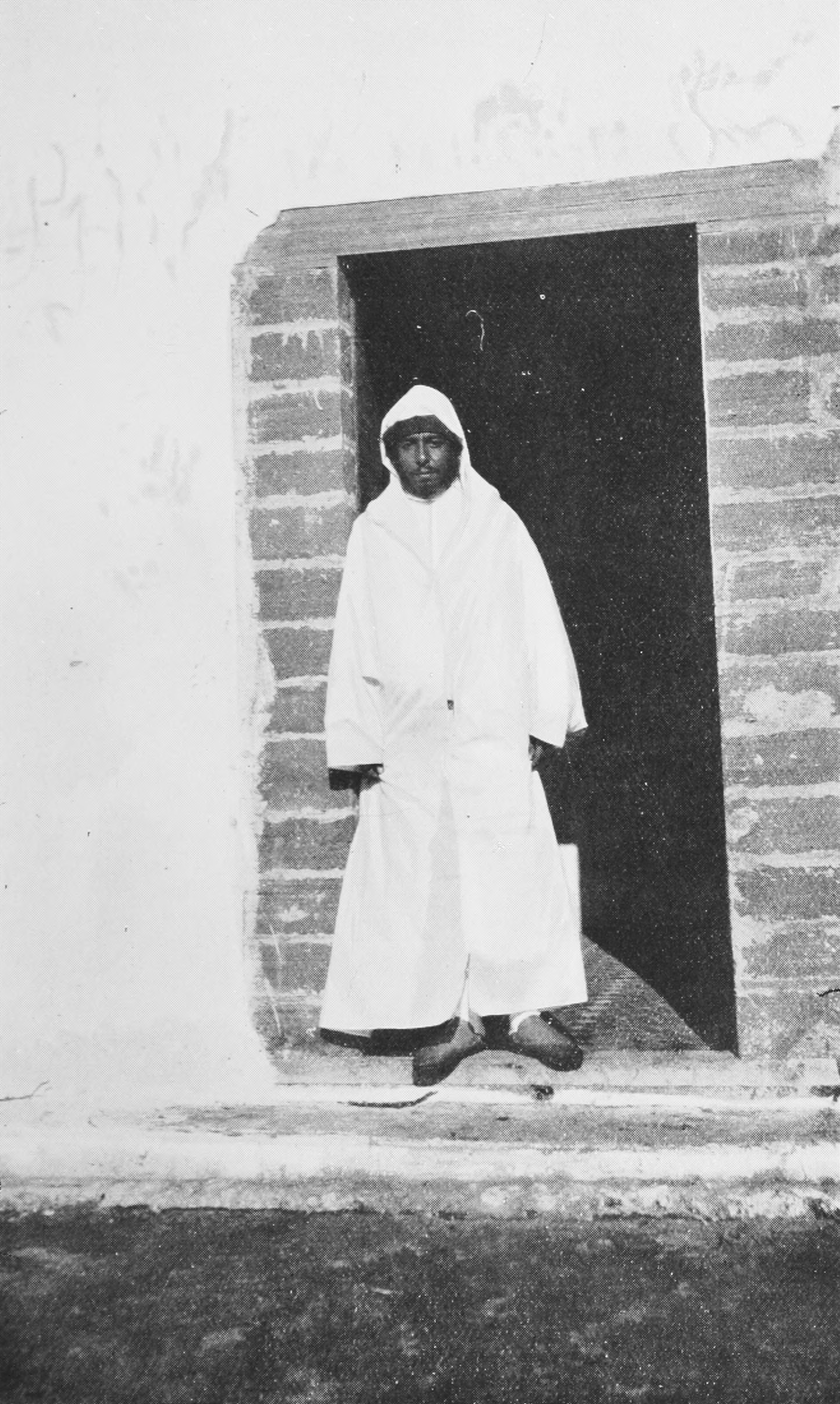
Abd al-Aziz in 1910

In November he came to terms with his brother, and thereafter took up his residence in Tangier as a pensioner of the new sultan. However the exercise of Moroccan law and order continued to deteriorate under Abd al-Hafid, leading to the Treaty of Fes in 1912, in which European nations assumed many responsibilities for the sultanate, which was divided into three zones of influence, under the French protectorate and the Spanish protectorate, while Abd al-Hafid was succeeded by his brother Yusef.

== Mariages and children ==
Moulay Abdelaziz married two women. The first was Khaduj who was the daughter of Caid Omar al-Youssi, the caid of the Ait Youssi tribe and pasha of Sefrou. His second wife was his cousin, Lalla Yasmin al-Alaoui. He had two known children:

- Moulay Hassan (b. July 1899 - d. 1919) was born in Marrakesh and died in Tangier aged 19 or 20 years old. His mother was Lalla Khadija. He was half-brother of Lalla Fatima Zahra.
- Lalla Fatima Zahra (b. 13 June 1927 - d. 15 September 2003) was born in Tangier and died in Rabat aged 76 years old. Her mother was Lalla Yasmin.

== Later life and death ==
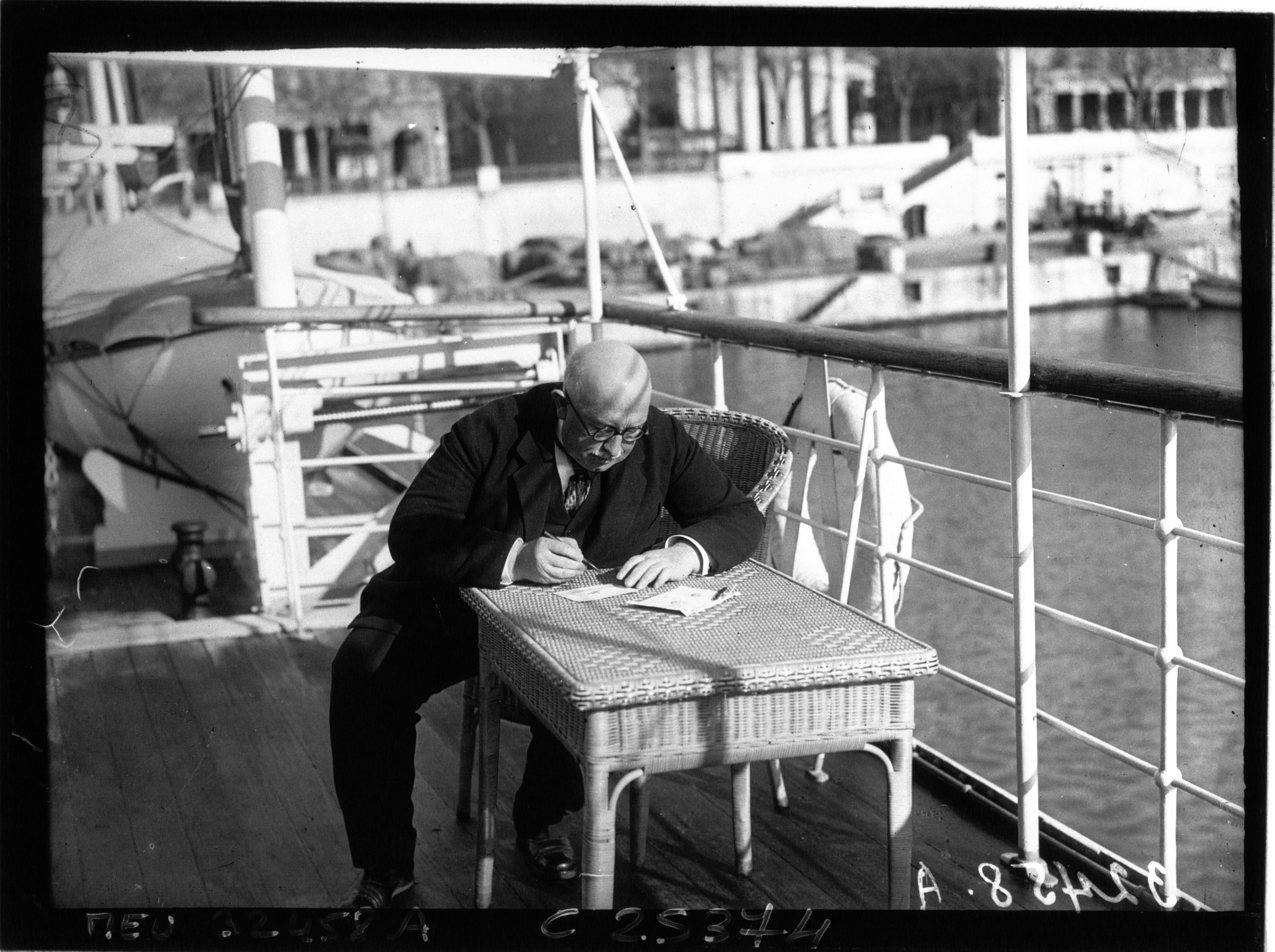
Abdelaziz on his yacht in 1926

Abdelaziz was considered as a replacement to Abd al-Hafid after his abdication but he demanded too many concessions to be acceptable.

In the course of 1919, Hubert Lyautey came to the conclusion that the return of Abdelaziz from his exile in France to Morocco would be desirable as it would remove his appeal as a potential rallying point for rebellion, and subsequently let him come to live in Tangier, by then a city under unsettled status that was part of neither the Spanish or French protectorates. Abdelaziz led an active social but mostly nonpolitical life in the city, from 1925 the Tangier International Zone, where he spent much of his time playing golf and lived in various residences including the Villa Al Amana and the Zaharat El-Jebel Palace. During the Spanish annexation of Tangier in 1940, he acquiesced insofar as the Moroccan palace authorities called the "makhzen" played a significant role therein.

Abdelaziz died in Tangier in 1943 and his body was transported to Fes, where he was buried in the royal necropolis of the Moulay Abdallah Mosque.

== Legacy and honours ==
Historian Douglas Porch characterised Abdelaziz as curious and kind in his personal relationships, but as a spoilt and 'weak man' who failed to manage foreign influences at court successfully. During his reign, he supported reformers who sought to modernise the kingdom and displayed a personal interest in European inventions. However, he also failed to perform the traditional religious and ceremonial functions expected of a ruler, thus losing the faith of his people.

He was portrayed by Marc Zuber in the film The Wind and the Lion (1975), a fictional version of the Perdicaris affair.

=== State Honours ===
- United Kingdom: Honorary Knight Grand Cross of the Order of the Bath (civil division), 2 July 1901
- Kingdom of Prussia: Grand Cross of the Order of the Red Eagle, 22 January 1902

== See also ==
- 'Alawi dynasty
- List of sultans of Morocco
- History of Morocco

== Bibliography ==
- Miller, Susan Gilson (2013). A History of Modern Morocco. Cambridge University Press. ISBN 9780521810708.
- Burke III, Edmund (1976). Prelude to Protectorate in Morocco: Pre-Colonial Protest and Resistance, 1860-1912. University of Chicago Press. ISBN 978-0-226-08084-0.
- Pennell, C. R. (2000). Morocco Since 1830: A History. Hurst. ISBN 978-1-85065-273-1.

Preceded by Hassan I	Sultan of Morocco; 1894–1908	Succeeded by Abd al-Hafid
