= Battle of Marrakesh (disambiguation) =

Battle of Marrakesh may refer to:

- Almohad conquest of Marrakesh (1147)
- Battle of Marrakesh (1908), part of the Hafidiya
- Battle of Sidi Bou Othman (1912), part of the French conquest of Morocco
