= Sarll =

Sarll is a surname. Notable people with this surname include:

- Billy Sarll (1899–1982), Australian Australian rules football player
- Darren Sarll (born 1983), English football manager and coach
- Tiger Sarll (1882–1977), British army captain and war correspondent
