= Tiger Sarll =

English Army Captain

Captain Tiger Sarll
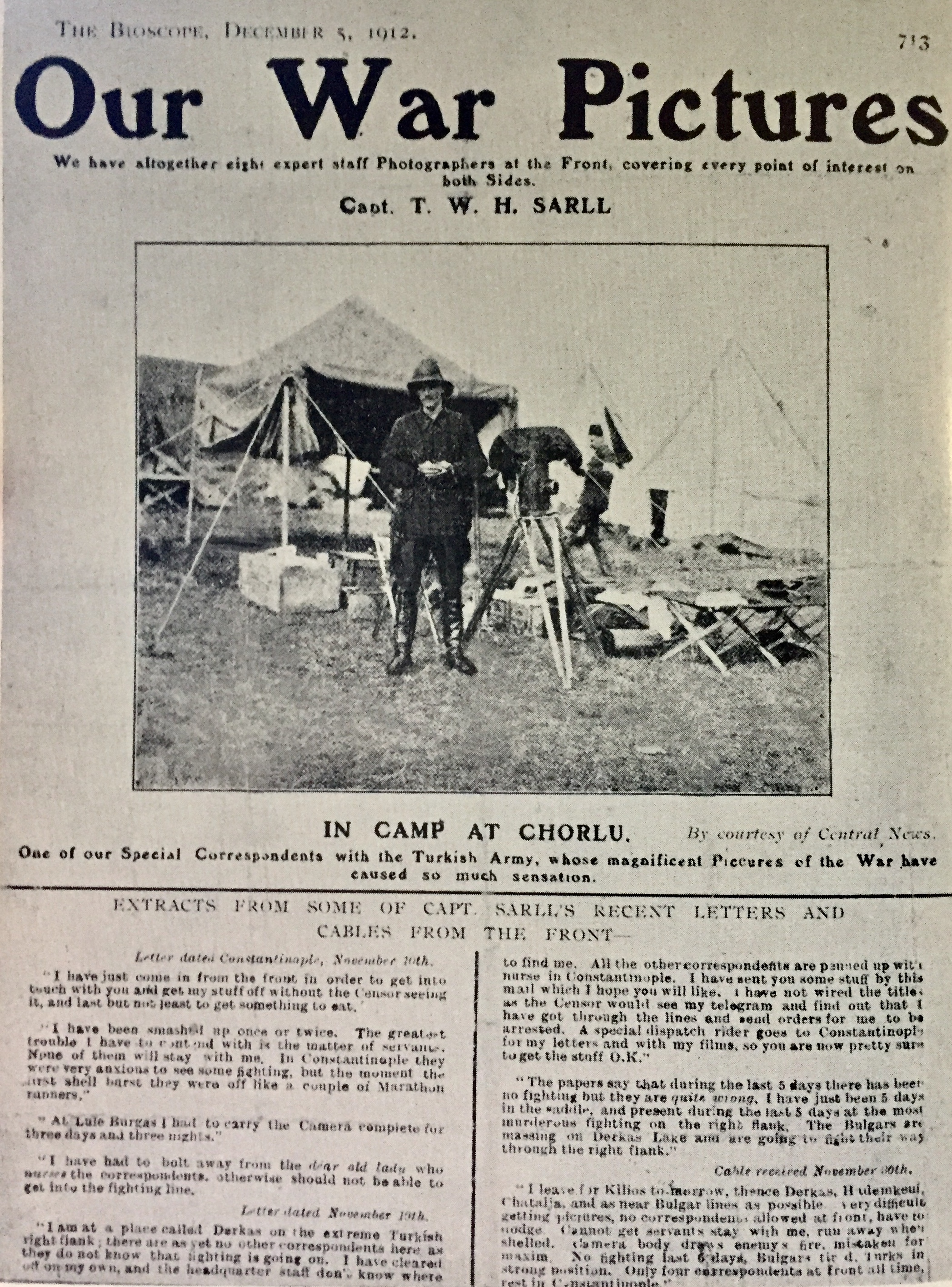
- Capt Tiger Sarll at the Balkan War
- Born: 23 September 1882; London, England
- Died: 8 July 1977 (aged 94)
- Military career
- Allegiance: United Kingdom
- Branch: British Army
- Rank: Captain
- Nickname: 'Tiger' Sarll
- Conflicts: Anglo-Boer War, German invasion of Belgium, Rif War, WW1, WW2
- Awards: Queen's South Africa Medal, King's South African Medal

Captain Thomas Henry William Bang-fee Sarll (23 September 1882 – 8 July 1977), known as Tiger Sarll, was a British Army captain, war correspondent, cameraman, animal trainer, and adventurer.

He first enlisted with the South African Light Horse in the Second Boer War where he was wounded on three occasions and lost the sight in his left eye. He then went on to join The Royal Canadian Dragoons where he travelled to Argentina and Mexico. After this excursion, he became a cameraman for Pathé, filming various battles from 1912 to 1914 including the Balkan War and the fighting in Belgium during World War I.

Shortly after Tiger went on as a journalist to report on the Rif War rebellion against the Spanish protectorate in Morocco. He then went on to catch pythons and alligators in Mexico for zoos and returned to England to start a circus act. During World War II he acted as a firefighter. His biography, written by Godfrey Lias OBE, was published after an appearance on the TV programme This is Your Life, where he notably failed to recognise some of his grown-up offspring ("You're not one of mine, are you? Which one are you?").

== Early years ==
Born 23 September 1882 in Highgate, north London, England, the only son of John Thomas Sarll BA, Sarll grew up in London with his parents and his sister Rosa. Sarll was the only survivor of two twins; his sibling being a premature birth with Sarll still in the womb. Tiger Sarll was known for his height, being claimed by his sister Rosa, to be 3 ft long at birth and reaching the height of 6 ft (180 centimetres) by the age of 12 and growing up to be 6 ft 4 in (193 centimetres). Sarll's family moved from Highgate to 64 Gower Street in 1890.

Sarll was christened Thomas Henry William Bang-fee Sarll at the age of 12; Bang-fee (translated as 'eagle' from Mandarin Chinese) because of the Chinese minister to London, a family friend of the Sarlls. Tiger from a young age was vegetarian and showed a love of animals that stayed with him his whole life; at 77 he snatched a rifle away from two young men who were shooting swans and broke the gun over his knee.

Sarll was also adept at handling animals; in his lifetime he would have a wide variety of pets including snakes and crocodiles, he was also a skilled jockey, at the age of eight onward Sarll rescued runaway carriage horses on his street. Sarll was adept at handling firearms as well. Sarll claims that by the age of 12, he could shoot the rim of a penny at 15 paces and shoot the ash off a cigar (held in his father's mouth) at 20 paces.

Sarll attended Highfield School, Clifton. After he ran away from school, walking to his home 25 miles away, his parents took him out of school. After meeting Florence Nightingale who remarked "You are a nice upright boy. You ought to be a soldier", Sarll, aged 17, boarded a ship on 11 November 1899 to fight in the Second Boer War.

== Boer War ==
Sarll's journey down to South Africa was where he met members of his soon to be new regiment, including Joe Lyons who had been a scout with Buffalo Bill and claimed to be an escort for Pony Post during the American Indian Wars. Sarll arrived in South Africa and joined the South African Light Horse, a cavalry regiment with one of the officers being Winston Churchill and under the command of the General Sir Redvers Buller. Sarll earned his nickname 'Tiger' after members of his regiment remarked that he made a cross between a snarl and a growl before entering battle. He also became known for his motto 'Live dangerously. It's cowards that get killed'.

It was around this time that Sarll was injured on three occasions. During the Battle of Colenso, a shell blew up at Sarll's feet, filling his neck with shrapnel and costing him the use of his left eye. He went straight back into battle after the wounds had been attended to, only to have his feet crushed by an out of control cannon. Sarll could still ride after this accident so he didn't report as sick and carried on the fight until he was hit by a bullet in the groin. The British doctors, after fixing his feet that had been broken for days, sent him home.

After returning home Sarll, once at full strength, went immediately back to the war again joining Sir G. F. Gorringe's flying column as a scout. During the Battle of Zaman Komst Sarll is credited with single-handedly holding a valley from advancing Boers, incapacitating two in his defence. Sarll earned a commission and was gazetted a Lieutenant on 28 October 1901 reporting to the Border Scouts. The Scouts were known as 'The Bastards'. During one occasion with 'The Bastards', Sarll was tracking the Boers only to find that he was being tracked. In order to throw them off his trail, he rode randomly in the South African bush, getting lost in the process. Sarll only survived being lost for 8 days by finding a farm with occupants willing to care for him.

Sarll returned to England soon after the signing of the Peace of Vereeniging on 31 May 1902. On leaving the army, he was gazetted as captain. From then on Sarll's temporary ranks included lieutenant, sub-lieutenant, trooper and provost marshal therefore also making him General Staff Officer. Sarll received two campaign medals awarded to participants in the war: the Queen's South Africa Medal, with clasps "Tugela Heights", "The Relief of Ladysmith" and "Cape Colony", and the King's South Africa Medal with the two clasps "South Africa, 1901" and "South Africa, 1902".

== Travels ==
Sarll returned to Africa to hunt big game, though very rarely killing any animals. On one occasion, he lost a part of his arm to a lion he was trying to release from a trap. During this time, Sarll travelled all over Africa, most notably Kenya (referred to as British East Africa), Nairobi, Belgian Congo, Southern Botswana.

Sarll, having had enough of big game hunting, went on to get a job as a ship-hand on a boat going to Canada. Arriving in Ottawa, Sarll took multiple jobs working at different farms. He later joined the Canadian Forestry Concern in Northern Ontario, whilst also looking for the Klondike gold of Dawson City. After buying a bark canoe from a local Indian, Sarll and some companions travelled nearly 1000 miles down the Yukon river in order to attempt to sign up for the Russo-Japanese War. During this journey, he saved the life of Paul J. Selles.

After failing to enlist with the Japanese, Sarll returned as a farmhand to Ottawa before joining The Royal Canadian Dragoons. During his time with the regiment, Sarll nearly killed a comrade with his mess fork. This same comrade left the regiment after stealing Sarll's medals from the Boer War. These were later returned to him on 16 January 1939. Sarll soon made his way back to England as a foreman aboard a boat that was transporting cattle.

== Acting ==
Sarll on his return to London joined Blakemore's Theatrical Agency and Denton's. He played multiple roles in various venues around London and the rest of England.

== War correspondent ==
Sarll became a war correspondent after volunteering to go to report on Morocco for Colonel Tamplin. Landing in Tangier, Sarll worked for The Morning Post who assisted him in getting to Casablanca by way of a French boat. To reach less travelled destinations, Sarll joined the French Foreign Legion. It was in Casablanca where Sarll met and worked with David McLellan, a photographer for the Daily Mirror. Sarll covered stories and fought with the French from inside the town while it was being set upon by the Moors.

Disapproving of the French laying train tracks through Muslim graveyards, Sarll returned to Tangier in order to solve the mystery of Mulai Ahmed er Raisuni (Raisuli) and his hostage Harry Aubrey de Vere Maclean. It was arranged for him to meet Raisuli, on the condition that Sarll played chess and brought some Western gifts with him. Sarll was led to a cave where he met Harry "Caid" Maclean, the man Raisuli was holding ransom. Sarll then went on to play chess against Raisuli and returning unsuccessful with no clear explanation to Tangier.

Sarll, after WW1, returned to Tangier to report for The Daily News about Abd el-Krim, who was raising rebels to push out the Spanish. He was granted an audience and stayed with Abd el-Krim and his rebel fighters in the mountains due to his sympathies with the Moroccans after Casablanca. He helped the rebel group install a French 75 mm field gun and was a tactical adviser to Abd el-Krim.

== Marriage ==
Returning home from Morocco, Sarll tried to meet up with his childhood Beau 'Kissy' Smith. After Sarll arrived at her house, Kissy refused to come down and so Sarll met her sister Sybil. Sarll married Sybil soon after Sybil's father's death, much to the disapproval of her family.

== South America ==
With Sybil now pregnant, Sarll made his way to South America to set up a life for them. During this journey, 1000 miles from land, the log-line got caught in the propeller and Sarll had to dive under a ship to cut it free. Sarll arrived in Buenos Aires on 6 May 1910. Taking a job overseeing the construction of a bridge at Carhué, Sarll brought Sybil out to live with him in a house made out of train carriages on tracks. During this time they suffered attempted burglaries, swarms of locusts and a meteorite falling very close to their railway home. They stayed at Carhué until their son fell ill. To get to a doctor, they had to travel across the perilous and unfinished bridge. Once his son had recovered, Sarll returned to the men that he had been given charge over. They rushed him, forcing him to retaliate and kill one of them with a hatchet. Sybil, pregnant with their second child, and their son boarded a ship to England, while Sarll took another job working as a tally clerk for a railway company.

Shortly after, Sarll went to fight in the Mexican Revolution in 1911, working for Francisco Madero as a tactical adviser to a force of 15,000, operating in Chihuahua. Sarll assisted the rebels with the siege of Guadalajara, where Sarll received the keys to the town from British consul Grenville Holmes.

== Film career ==
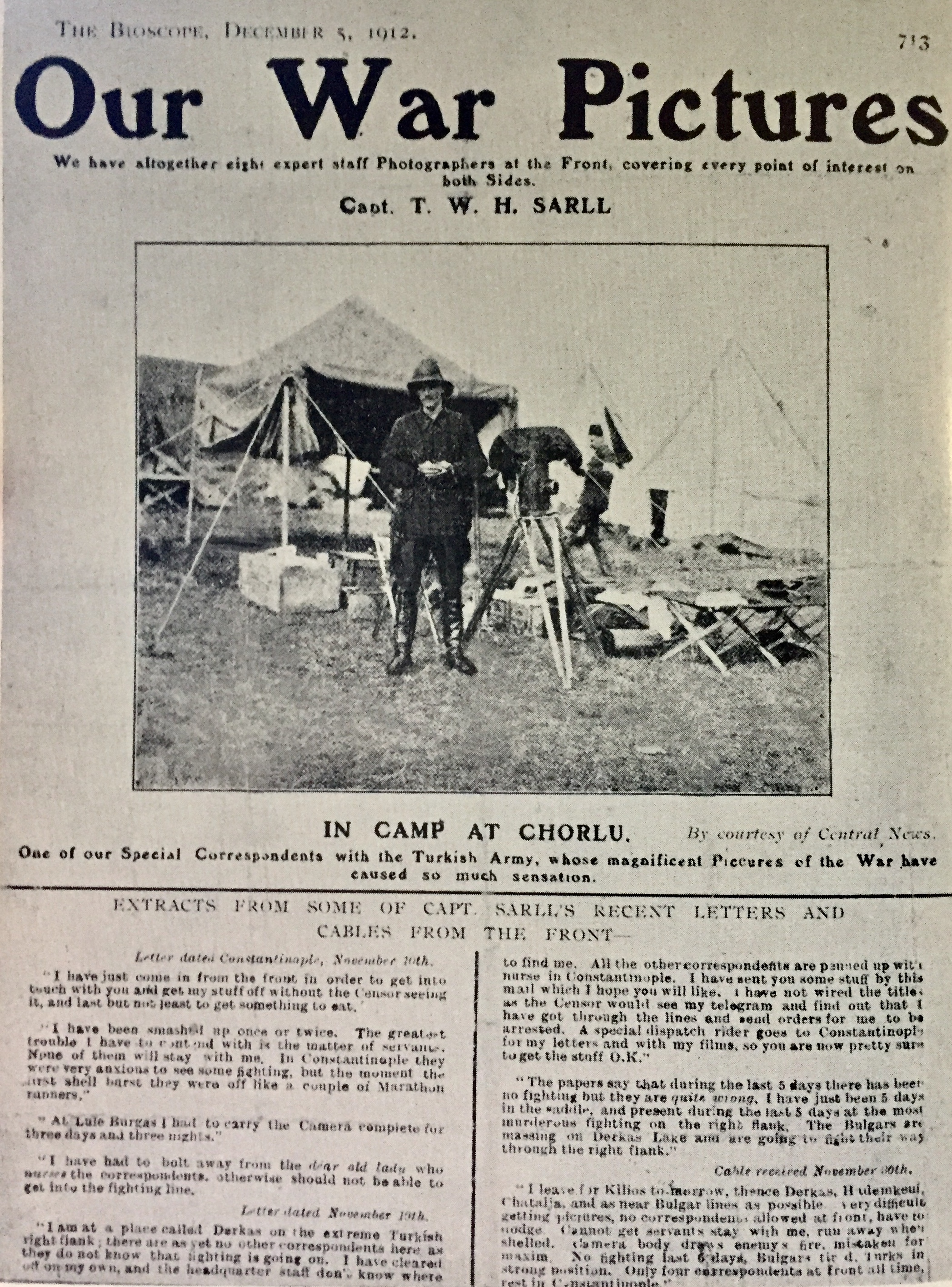
A picture of Capt Tiger Sarll in the Balkan War featured in the Bioscope

Sarll, after returning from Mexico, found a job as a cameraman for Warwick Film Company. He managed to film (unbeknownst to him) Emily Davison throwing herself under the King's horse in 1913. Sarll persuaded his employers, Pathé Gazette, to send him to Istanbul to film the First Balkan War. Sarll teamed up with Sir Hubert Wilkins to capture pictures of the Battle of Lule Burgas. Narrowly avoiding execution at the hands of the Bulgars, Sarll had to bribe his captors with £400 in gold to let him go. Sarll claimed he had to cut up his films into small pieces to post them in order to avoid the Turkish censors. Sarll returned to England in 1913.

== World War I ==
Before the start of World War I, Sarll was hired by Transatlantic and Universal Film Company to film in Belgium. He arrived in Brussels on 31 July 1914. Sarll was suspected of being a German spy and was arrested by the local authorities, only to be let free by Paul J. Selles, a man he saved in Canada. By the command of the Mayor of Brussels, Adolphe Max, Sarll and Selles engaged the German Uhlan cavalry. After this spat, Sarll took the camera to London and returned to fight at the front in Europe at the Forts at Namur.

Sarll and Selles were captured by the Germans. The Germans tied them up and drank looted liquor. The Germans fell into a stupor, allowing Sarll and his companion to escape. However, Selles, against the wishes of Sarll, returned to the place they were held to fetch Sarll's telescope and got captured again. Sarll had to escape Belgium. He was assisted by locals to the sea where he stole a rowing boat under fire and rowed back to England across the Channel.

On his return, Sarll visited Herbert Kitchener, 1st Earl Kitchener (who was also godfather to one of his sons) to deliver news from Belgium. Sarll was sent to a Sportsmen's Battalion. Whilst in this battalion, MI5 approached him as they had caught a suspected spy; it was Paul J. Selles, who had survived German capture. Sarll left the army and joined the Navy, due to his knowledge of Turkey. This was short lived however as he was not allowed to go with his division to the Dardanelles.

He was offered a position in the Army as Assistant Provost Marshal where he was stationed at Weymouth as General Staff Officer. He lived with his family in five caravan train cars in Dorset. With the war over Sarll returned to the Thames Valley. Sarll bought Morley House, in large part, due to a gift of £500 made to him by Colonel White.

== Post-war years ==
Sarll made a fortune trading goods from Morocco over a period of three years. He sold through Harrods at one point and his success was due to his relationship with Abd el-Krim. After the Rif War Sarll's trade in Moroccan goods failed. It was at this time that his wife Sybil left him.

Zoos and private collectors of animals hired Sarll to go abroad and capture large reptiles with his team. He was known to catch alligators in Mexico with only his hands and a lasso. In 1927, Sarll visited Guadalupe Island to see the very rare elephant seals. He was "worried that these huge, harmless, rather helpless amphibians would soon be extinct". It was during this excursion that he also visited Clarion Island. While the crew were on the island, Sarll saw and shot a giant squid that had come alongside the ship, perhaps mistaking the ship for a whale. After his return, Sarll headed into the Mexican jungle with the intention of python-snaring. He brought in up to 17 pythons a day on this expedition.

== Circus Act ==
Sarll travelled via New York on his way back from Mexico. There he saw a man wrestling an alligator in a pool and was inspired to set up a reptile wrestling act of his own. He called himself Rais Sarll and in his act he wrestled and hypnotised alligators and pythons. He was well received in England though he did have some difficulties with his acts. On one occasion a 14 foot (4.3 m) python that he had wrapped around his neck started to constrict and he required the help of a policeman in the audience to get it off.

On another occasion, a python swallowed one of his arms up to the shoulder; he badly scarred his arm pulling the python off. Thieves broke into Sarll's big top and let six alligators go by accident. Sarll found five but worried about the sixth missing animal. Five years later a 'crocodile' was hauled out of the Thames; Sarll suspected it was one of his. He also used to go shopping at Bentalls with a lion, which nearly led to him being banned by the store chain.

Among other acts, he trained rats to do tricks. He also trained a gorilla to smoke. He said: "young gorillas are more lovable and more intelligent than chimpanzees, but are more dangerous as they grow older". When World War II broke out in 1939, food was rationed and Sarll was no longer able to feed any of his animals and so was forced to put them down himself.

== World War II ==
After being turned down by the War Office a second time, Sarll found work as a firefighter with the Thames River Police. During the evacuation of Dunkirk, Sarll rowed a canoe over the English Channel, rescuing only one person whom he dropped off with one of the larger ships. He worked during The Blitz, saving people from incendiary bombs. He spent most of his time collecting munitions from the beach and dropping them off at a nearby destroyer. He got badly injured when a German soldier stabbed him in the arm with a bayonet. The officer in charge saw that Sarll was a civilian and let him go. Sarll joined the Royal Air Force in 1940 as a pilot officer, going on to become a flight lieutenant.

By 1940, four of Sarll's sons and three of his daughters were in the Royal Air Force and two of his sons were awarded the Distinguished Flying Cross. One of his sons was a wing commander.

== Last years ==
After the war, Sarll worked as a security officer for Aron's, an engineering firm in Kilburn. Later, at the age of 78 he worked as security at Bradwell nuclear power station close to Bradwell-on-Sea. He died at the age of 94 on 8 July 1977.
