= Order of Muhammad =

Highest state decoration of the Kingdom of Morocco

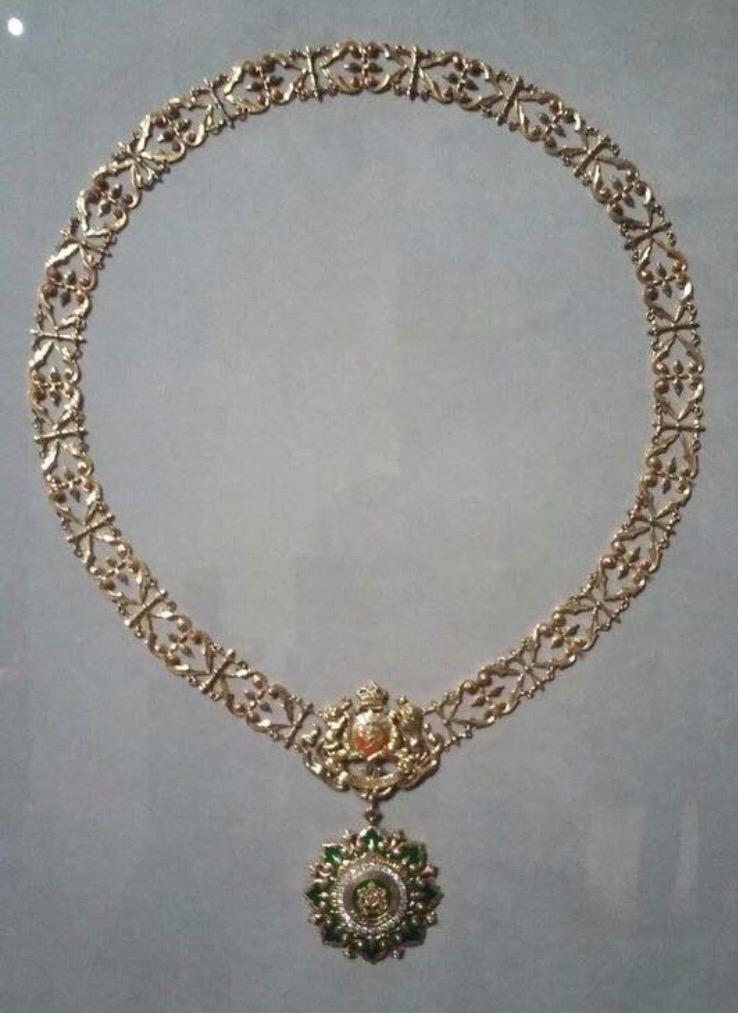
- Special class of the Order

Awarded by The King of Morocco
- Established: 16 November 1956; 69 years ago
- Royal house: Alaouite
- Religious affiliation: Islam
- Ribbon
- Status: Currently constituted
- Sovereign: King Mohammed VI
- Grades: Special Class, 1st Class, 2nd Class

Precedence
- Next (higher): None (highest)
- Next (lower): Order of Ouissam Alaouite

The Order of Muhammad, also referred to as Order of Sovereignty (Arabic: الوسام المحمدي, romanized: Wissam al-Mohammadi, French: Ordre de la Souveraineté or Ordre de Mohammed), is the highest state decoration of the Kingdom of Morocco. The Order was instituted on 16 November 1956 by King Mohammed V of Morocco, who reigned between 1927 and 1961.

== Classes ==
The Order of Muhammad is issued in three classes, one special and two ordinary:

- Special Class: who wears a diamonds and with rubies decorated collar around the neck. The chain has nineteen golden links in the form of stylized flowers in filigree gold and comes together in a large enamelled coat of arms in European style. A badge is suspended to this coat of arms and has the shape of a gold star with ten points. A part of the surface is green enamelled. The central disk of the badge shows the Moroccan coat of arms. Only the badge of the Special Class and the first class contains edged ring set with rubies and diamonds and an outer ring of 36 diamonds. The Special Class is awarded to monarchs and heads of state.

The ordinary classes:

- First Class: who wears a badge in the shape of a star decorated with precious stones on the left chest.
- Second Class: who wears a badge of the order in the shape of a star, but without gemstones, on the left chest.

== Eligibility ==
The Order is only eligible for members of the Moroccan royal family, as well as foreign monarchs, princes and princesses, and foreign heads of state. Ordinary Moroccans can also be taken up in this order, although with great exception.

== Recipients ==
Special class

1966

- Mohammad Reza Pahlavi: Shah of Iran.

2002

- Hamad bin Khalifa Al Thani: Emir of Qatar.

2003

- Pervez Musharraf: President of the Islamic Republic of Pakistan.

2004

- Ricardo Lagos: President of Chile.

2007

- Nicolas Sarkozy: President of the French Republic.

2008

- Akihito: Emperor of Japan.

2013

- François Hollande: President of the Republic of France.
- Alassane drama Ouattara: president of Ivory Coast.
- Tamim bin Hamad Al Thani: Emir of Qatar.

2014

- Ibrahim Boubacar Keïta: President of the Republic of Mali.
- Alpha Condé: President of Guinea.
- Moncef Marzouki: President of the Republic of Tunisia.
- Felipe VI and Leitizia: Spain's Sovereigns.

2015

- Mohamed bin Zayed Al Nahyan: crown prince of Abu Dhabi.
- José Mario Vaz: President of the Republic of Guinea-Bissau.

2016

- Paul Kagame: President of the Republic of Rwanda.
- Marcelo Nuno Duarte Rebelo de Sousa: President of the Republic of Portugal.
- John Pombe Magufuli: President of Tanzania.
- Hery Rajaonarimampianina: President of the Republic of Madagascar.

2017

- Nana Akufo-Addo: President of the Republic of Ghana.

2021

- Donald Trump: President of the United States.
- Abdullah II: King of Jordan

2024

- Emmanuel Macron: President of the French Republic

Second class

2007

- Lalla Aicha: princess of Morocco.
- Lalla Fatima: princess of Morocco.
- Lalla Lamia: princess of Morocco.
- Lalla Amina: princess of Morocco.
- Haile Selassie
- Albert II of Belgium
- Queen Paola of Belgium
- Hassanal Bolkiah
- Jefri Bolkiah, Prince of Brunei
- Dwight D. Eisenhower
- Elizabeth II
- Faisal II of Iraq
- Hussein of Jordan
- Hamad bin Isa Al Khalifa
- Idris of Libya
- Prince Ghazi bin Muhammad
- Moza bint Nasser
- Mohammad Reza Pahlavi
- Juan Carlos I of Spain
- Queen Sofía of Spain
- Prince Muhammad bin Talal
