= Mulai Ahmed er Raisuni =

Moroccan tribal leader and rebel (1871–1925)

- مولاي أحمد الريسوني
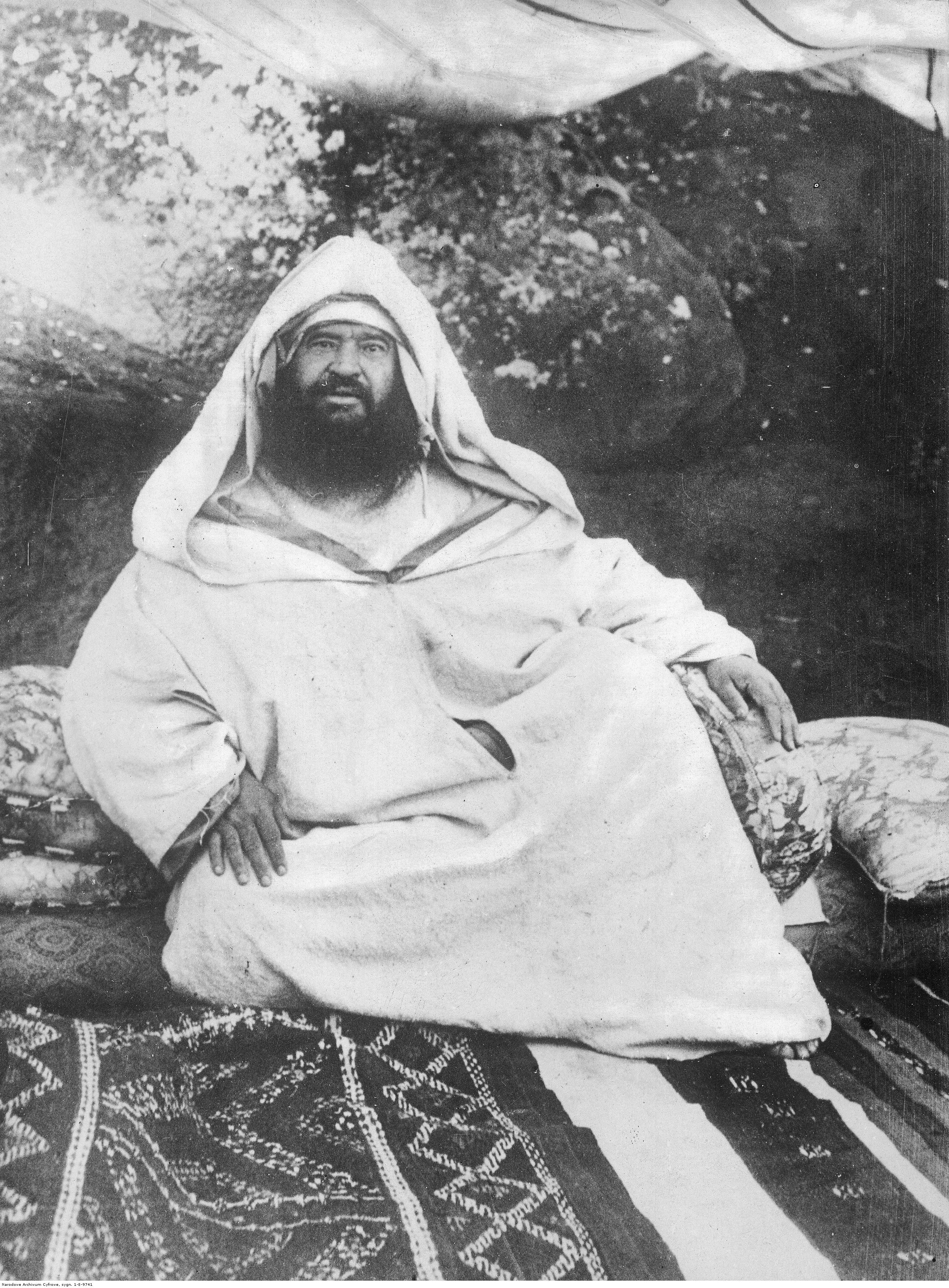
- Born: 1871; Zinat
- Died: April 1925 (aged 53–54); Prison in Tamassint (near Al Hoceima)

Mulai Ahmed er Raisuni (Arabic: مولاي أحمد الريسوني, romanized: Mūlāy ʿAḥmad al-Raisūnī), known as Raisuli to most English speakers, also Raissoulli, Rais Uli, and Raysuni; 1871 – April 1925) was a Sharif (descendant of the Islamic prophet Muhammad), and a leader of the Jebala tribal confederacy in Morocco at the turn of the 20th century.

While he was regarded by foreigners and the Moroccan government as a brigand, some Moroccans, especially among the Jebala, considered him a heroic figure, fighting a repressive, corrupt government, while others considered him a thief. Historian David S. Woolman referred to Raisuni as "a combination Robin Hood, feudal baron, and tyrannical bandit." He was considered by many as "the last of the Barbary Pirates" though Barbary Coast piracy had ended by the middle of the 19th century. On the other hand, according to Douglas Porch, an American historian, Raisuni was part of the rule rather than the exception in that every successful Moroccan politician at the time combined villainy with sainthood.

He died in April 1925 after having been captured and imprisoned by his rival Abd el Krim.

== Early life ==
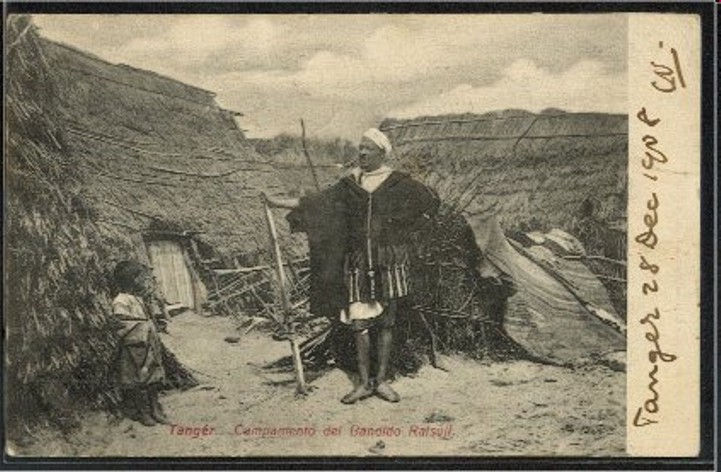
A goumi standing guard in the camp of Mulai Ahmed er Raisuli in Tangier, Morocco.

Mulai Ahmed er Raisuni was born in the village of Zinat sometime in 1871 to the Bni Msawwar tribe. He was an Idrisi Sharif who descended from Abd al-Salam ibn Mashish. Due to his place of origin and his reportedly handsome visage, one of his other nicknames was "the Eagle of Zinat." He was the son of a prominent Caid, and began following in his father's footsteps. However, Raisuni eventually drifted into crime, stealing cattle and sheep and earning the ire of Moroccan authorities. He was also widely known as a womanizer.

By most accounts, the formative event in Raisuni's life was his arrest and imprisonment by Abd-el-Rahman Abd el-Sadaq, the Pasha of Tangier of the Abdelsadaq branch of the Hamamin Temsamani family, descandants of the jaysh Rifi. The Pasha had invited Raisuni to dinner in his home in Tangier, only for his men to capture and brutalize Raisuni when he arrived. He was sent to the dungeon of Mogador and chained to a wall for four years. His friends were allowed to bring him food and he managed to survive. Raisuni was released from prison as part of a general clemency early in the reign of Sultan Abdelaziz - soon to become Raisuni's greatest enemy.

== Outlaw and pirate ==
Raisuni was hardened by his imprisonment, and returned to criminality after his release. However, he became more ambitious than before, growing to resent the Sultan's fealty to the various European powers - Britain, France, Spain and Germany - jockeying for influence in Morocco. With a small but devoted band of followers, Raisuni embarked on a second career: kidnapping prominent officials and holding them for ransoms.

Raisuni's first victim was Walter Burton Harris, an Englishman and correspondent for The Times who already knew Raisuni. He demanded not money, but the release of several of Raisuni's men held in prison; Harris was released after only three weeks captivity.

Many of Raisuni's other victims of this time were Moroccan military and political officials; his men only rarely kidnapped Europeans. In between kidnappings, Raisuni extorted "tribute" from villagers in territories controlled by his followers, executing those who refused to pay. He also periodically maintained a small fleet of boats for seagoing piracy; however, he was less successful in this endeavor than in his kidnapping and extortion schemes.

Raisuni had a mixed reputation. He became known for his chivalry and respectful attitude toward his hostages; he pledged Ion Perdicaris that he would defend him from any harm and was known to have befriended many of his other hostages. He was also known as a well-educated man who enjoyed reading any book he could, and was extremely generous to his family and followers.

However, towards those who were not worthy of ransom, emissaries of the Pasha and the Sultan, or those disloyal to him, he was known for cruelty. A favorite punishment of Raisuni's was burning out an enemy's eyes with heated copper coins. On one occasion, he returned the head of an envoy to the Pasha in a basket of melons.

=== The Perdicaris incident ===
In 1904, Raisuni was propelled onto the international stage when he kidnapped the Greek-American expatriate Ion Perdicaris and his stepson Cromwell Varley and held them for a ransom of $70,000 ($2,510,000 in 2025). American President Theodore Roosevelt, then running for re-election, made political capital out of the incident, sending a squadron of warships to Morocco to force Abdelaziz's compliance with Raisuni's demands, famously proclaiming "Perdicaris Alive or Raisuli Dead!"

After a near-confrontation between the government of Morocco and troops of the United States of America, Raisuni received his ransom money and concessions; he was appointed Pasha of Tangier and Governor of Jibala province, and all of his imprisoned followers were released. However, Raisuni was ousted from the post in 1906 due to corruption and cruelty to his subjects; a year later he was again declared an outlaw by the Moroccan government.

Shortly after his dismissal, Raisuni kidnapped Sir Harry "Caid" Maclean, a British army officer serving as a military aide to the Sultan's army. Raisuni ransomed Maclean for £20,000 from the British government (£2,100,000 in 2025).

== Later years ==
For years, Raisuni continued to antagonize the Moroccan government, even after Abdelaziz's forced abdication. He briefly regained favor with the Moroccan government, by siding with Mulay Hafid's overthrow of Abdelaziz, and was restored again as Pasha of Tangier. However, at the instigation of the Spanish government, the Sultan removed Raisuni from his post in 1912.

In 1913, Raisuni led several Rif tribes in a bloody revolt against the Spanish, and continued a protracted guerilla war against them. His men were finally defeated by Colonel Manuel Fernández Silvestre on 3 October 1919 in the Battle of Fondak Pass, although Raisuni and most of his troops managed to slip away. Silvestre was later infamous as the Spanish commander at the Battle of Annual.

During World War I, Raisuni was reportedly in contact with agents of the German government to lead a tribal rebellion against France. Responding to these rumors, French troops launched a punitive expedition into Spanish Morocco in May 1915, which dispersed Raisuni's followers but failed to capture Raisuni himself. In September 1922, and after an interview with Colonel José Villalba Riquelme and permission of the High Commissioner of Spain in Morocco, Ricardo Burguete, he submitted to the Spanish authorities and subsequently joined forces with the Spanish army in the Rif War of the 1920s. This agreement was heavily criticized at the time as Raisuni's forces, heavily weakened by their conflict with Abd el Krim, were seen as on the verge of defeat. Raisuni was intensely jealous of Abd el Krim and his growing popularity with the Rif peoples, hoping to gain control of Western Morocco with a Spanish victory.

In January 1925, after the Spanish army retreat to the Estella Line, Abd el Krim's followers attacked Raisuni's palace, killing most of his guards and capturing Raisuni. He was jailed in Tamasint (near Al Hoceima), where he died by the end of April 1925, having suffered from dropsy (Edema) for several years. Rumors of his survival persisted, however, as Raisuni had been erroneously reported dead in 1914 and 1923. He is still regarded as a folk hero by many in Morocco, although his reputation is mixed at best.

== Portrayal in popular culture ==
=== Movies ===
- The Wind and the Lion - He was portrayed by Sean Connery in the heavily fictionalized 1975 film The Wind and the Lion, which was filmed in Spain by the American director John Milius. Milius drew largely on an American Heritage magazine article by Barbara W. Tuchman.

=== Books ===
A number of other works have been published about Raisuni, though many are now out of print.

- Full-length biography of Raisuli written by Rosita Forbes: The Sultan of the Mountains: The Life Story of the Raisuli, published the year of Raisuli's death (1925).
- French historian I.S. Allouche published a collection of his correspondence with Raisuni in 1951.Allouche 1951
- Raisuni is also featured in Walter B. Harris's memoir, Morocco That Was.
- An American Among the Riffi.
- Rebels in the Rif: Abd el Krim and the Rif Rebellion.
- A history of the Rif War in The Conquest of Morocco.

== Bibliography ==
Notes

References

- Chandler, James A. (April 1975). "Spain and Her Moroccan Protectorate 1898 - 1927". Journal of Contemporary History. 10 (2). Sage Publications, Ltd: 301–322. doi:10.1177/002200947501000205. ISSN 1461-7250. JSTOR 260149. S2CID 159817508.
- Forbes, Rosita (1924). The Sultan of the Mountains: The Life Story of Raisuli. New York: Holt. - Total pages: 351
- Hart, David Montgomery (2001). Qabila: Tribal Profiles and Tribe-state Relations in Morocco and on the Afghanistan-Pakistan Frontier. Amsterdam: Het Spinhuis. ISBN 978-90-5589-204-4. OCLC 49945615. - Total pages: 254
- "Raisuli Busy for Germany". The New York Times. New York City. May 27, 1915. ISSN 1553-8095. OCLC 1645522.
- Porch, Douglas (2005). The Conquest of Morocco (2nd ed.). New York: Farrar, Straus & Giroux. ISBN 978-1-4299-9885-7. - Total pages: 368
- Simon, Jeffrey D. (2001). The Terrorist Trap: America's Experience with Terrorism (2nd ed.). Bloomington, IN: Indiana University Press. ISBN 978-0-253-02826-6. - Total pages: 496
- "The Real Raisuni". The Star. 19 October 1907.
- "National Affairs: Defiance". Time. TIME Magazine. June 8, 1925.
- "Foreign News: El Riff". Time. TIME Magazine. August 17, 1925a.
- Tuchman, Barbara Wertheim (August 1959). "Perdicaris Alive or Raisuli Dead! - later republished in Tuchman's compilation book Practicing History: Selected Essays (1981)". American Heritage. 10 (5): 104–117. ISSN 0002-8738.
- Weir, William (2008). Guerrilla Warfare: Irregular Warfare in the Twentieth Century. Mechanicsburg, PA: Stackpole Books. ISBN 978-0-8117-3497-4. - Total pages: 240
- Woolman, David S. (1968). Rebels in the Rif: Abd el Krim and the Rif Rebellion. Stanford, California: Stanford University Press. - Total pages: 257
- Bensoussan, David (2010). Il Était Une Fois Le Maroc: Témoignages Du Passé Judéo-Marocain (in French). Québec: Éditions Du Lys. ISBN 978-2-922505-21-4.
- Allouche, Ichoua Sylvain (1951). Hespéris. Vol. 38. Paris: Emile Larose. pp. 327–353.
- Harris, Walter Burton (1921). Morocco That Was. Edinburgh and London: W. Blackwood and Sons. - Total pages: 333
- Sheean, Vincent (1926). An American Among the Riffi. New York and London: The Century Company. - Total pages: 345
