= Zinat =

Zinat جماعة سبت الزينات Sebt Zinat
- Location in Morocco Zinat (Africa)
- Coordinates: 35°26′N 5°24′W
- Country: Morocco
- Region: Tanger-Tetouan-Al Hoceima
- Time zone: UTC+0 (GMT)

Zinat (Arabic: جماعة سبت الزينات, Berber languages: ⵣⵉⵏⴰⵜ, also known as Sebt zinat) is a village in northern Morocco, situated 50 kilometres east of the city of Tangier, 20 south of the city of Tétouan. It is also home to Ibn Battuta Dam which provides the city of Tangier with drinking water.

The village was featured in Walter Burton Harris' 1921 book Morocco That Was, where he detailed being held captive by Jbala leader Mulai Ahmed er Raisuni in the village in June 1903. Harris was released 3 weeks later.
