= Lalla Fatima Zahra bint Abdelaziz =

Moroccan princess

Lalla Fatima Zohra
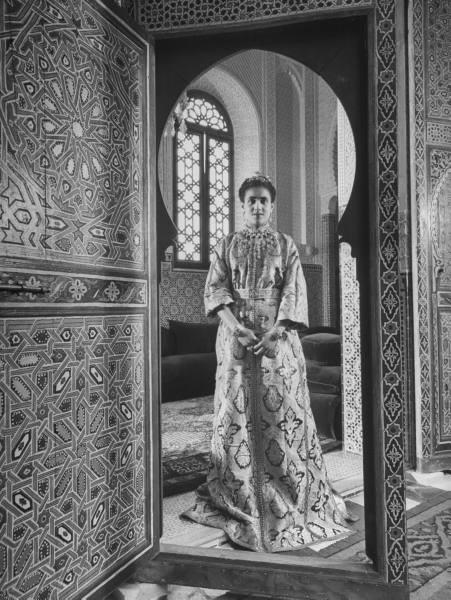
- Born: 13 June 1927; Tangier, Morocco
- Died: 15 September 2003 (aged 76); Rabat, Morocco
- Spouse: Moulay Hassan ben el-Mehdi (m.1949 – div.1972)
- Issue: Sharifa Lalla Oum Kelthoum
Names
- Lalla Fatima Zahra bint Abdelaziz bin Hassan al-Alaoui
- House: Alaouite dynasty
- Father: Abdelaziz of Morocco
- Mother: Lalla Yasmin alAlaoui
- Religion: Islam

Princess Lalla Fatima-Zahra (13 June 1927 – d. 15 September 2003) was the daughter of Sultan Abdelaziz of Morocco and his wife, Lalla Yasmin Al Alaoui.

== Biography ==
Lalla Fatima Zahra was born in Tangier. Her parents are Sultan Abdelaziz of Morocco and his wife Lalla Yasmin al-Alaoui. She was born to a former Sultan of Morocco as her father abdicated in 1908 and took up his residence in Tangier as a pensioner of his successor sultan Moulay Abd al-Hafid. In Tangier Lalla Fatima Zahra went to school at l'École italienne and then pursued high school in the same city at the Collège français where she obtained her baccalauréat.

== Patronages ==
Lalla Fatima Zahra dedicated her efforts to women's rights in Morocco. In 2001, she dared to break a taboo by speaking publicly about AIDS in Morocco. She chaired a number of organizations and was notably President of:

- (1969–2003) the National Union of Moroccan Women, appointed by King Hassan II.

She was also Honorary President of:

- (1971) the Moroccan Family Planning Association;
- the Moroccan Association for Contemporary Creations (AMCC);
- the Tangiers Region Association for Cultural Action;
- (2001) the Tangiers International Music Festival.

== Private life ==
Aged 16 she was engaged to her future husband, a distant cousin, Moulay Hassan ben el-Mehdi then Caliph of Tetuan. Their wedding took place on June 6, 1949, in Tetuan. Her wedding was celebrated in great fanfare in this Spanish occupied city and many Moroccan and Spanish dignitaries were invited. The couple have one daughter.

In 1955, after Mohammed V's return from exile, her husband renewed his allegiance to the King and relinquished his position as Caliph. He was then appointed ambassador to the United Kingdom from 1957 to 1965, then to Rome from 1965 to 1967. She accompanied her husband during his two mandates as ambassador. They divorced in 1972.

== Honours ==
=== National honours ===
- Grand Officer of the Order of Mehdauia of Tetuan (1949).
- Dame Grand Cordon of the Order of the Throne.

=== Foreign honours ===
- France: Commandeur of the Order of the Legion of Honour (11 August 2003).

== Death and burial ==
Lalla Fatima Zahra died on 15 September 2003 in the medical clinic of the Royal palace of Rabat at the age of 76 years old. She was buried in the Moulay Al Hassan mausoleum, located within the grounds of the Royal palace of Rabat.
