= Bled es-Siba =

Lawless area in the early 20th century Morocco

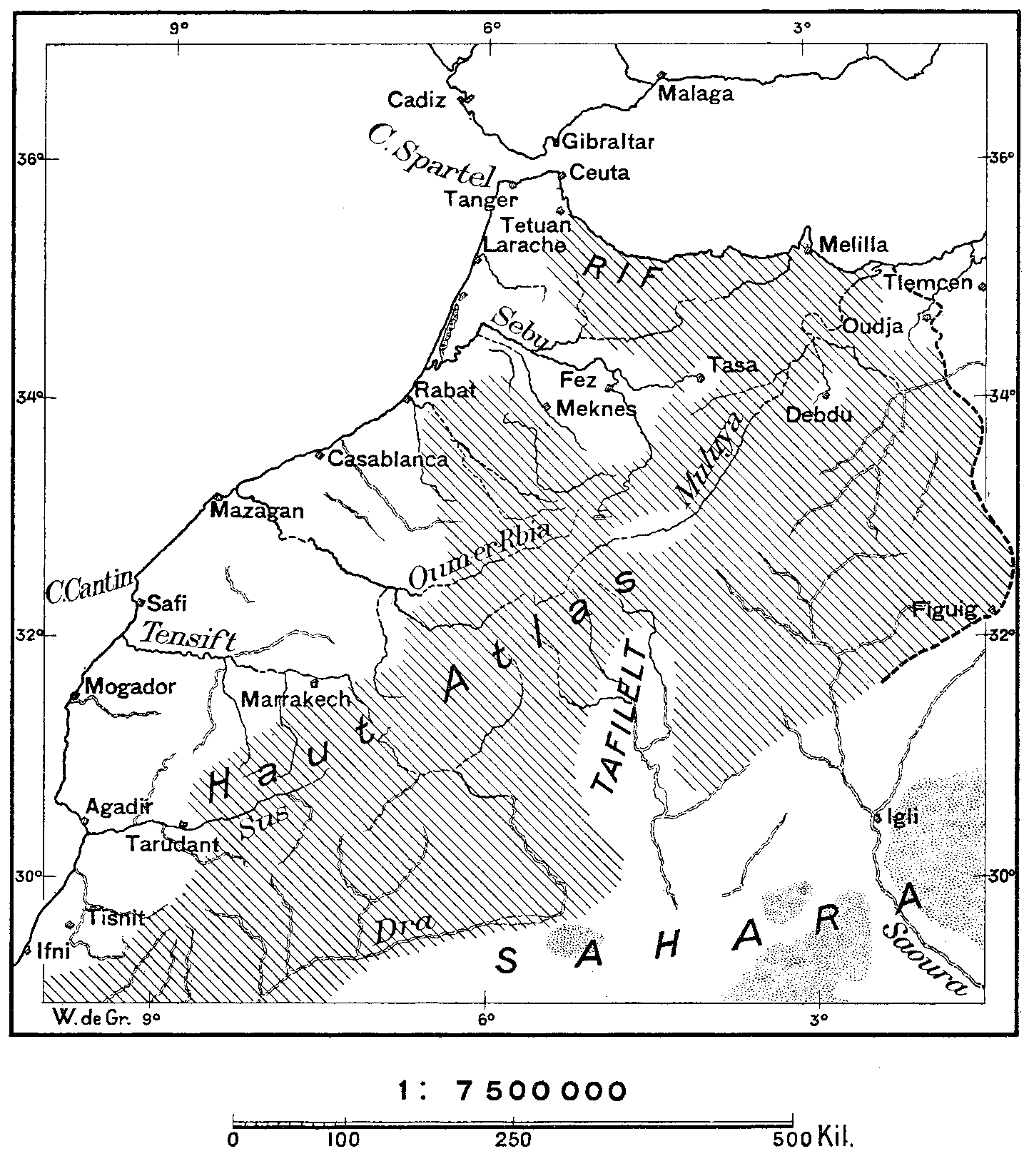
20th century map depicting Bled es-Siba (highlighted)

Bled es-Siba or Bled Siba (Arabic: بلاد السيبة, romanized: Bilād al-Sība, lit. 'land of dissidence'), is a historical term that emerged in French colonial literature that refers to a lawless area in pre-colonial Moroccan history that was out of the control of the Moroccan Sultans.

== Etymology ==
Bled es-Siba literally means "land of dissidence" or "region of anarchy", as opposed to Bled el-Makhzen, which refers to the region under the control of the Makhzen governing institution. The term Bled es-Siba probably first appeared in an eleventh-century commentary on Maliki law by Abu Imran al-Fasi. Onwards, it was used from the eleventh-century in al-Andalus and the Maghreb to refer to backwards rural areas living in a state of jahiliyyah.

Sība (سيبة) is a colloquial Arabic word meaning "rebellion", "insolence" or "stateless". It comes from the classical Arabic term sā'iba meaning "a free, untethered camel" and the first known pre-Islamic instance of the word sība refers “to a camel set aside from the herd, left to fend for itself, as a form of sacrifice.” It comes from the Arabic root sby (meaning to take prisoner, to capture, to fascinate). In the Maghreb, it is synonymous with the classical term fitna.

== Historical background ==
Morocco has been ruled by the Alaouite dynasty since the 17th century. Many Berber tribes were however, not submissive to the Sultan, which led to two different regions: Bled es-Siba and Bled el-Makhzen.

== Historiography ==
The distinction between Bled es-Siba and Bled el-Makhzen emerged in French historiography and ethnography This distinction was important to how the French portrayed their mission in Morocco and functioned as the basis for French policies in colonial Morocco. It was first developed by French army officer and author Maurice Le Glay. Historian Edmund Burke III summarising this policy said:

In general, this view of Morocco and the Moroccan past has emphasized the division of the realm into two zones, one where the central government (the makhzan) was supreme, taxes were collected, governors governed, and laws were respected, and the other where the central government was impotent, and unruly tribes devoted their time to feuding and banditry. Under the rubric of Bled el-makhzan and Bled es-siba, the portrait of a regime divided between contradictory tendencies toward autocratic order and anarchy, in which neither was able to gain the upper hand has gained widespread acceptance. Closely interwoven with this image has been a second one, a view of a profound ethnic split in Moroccan society between Arabs and Berbers. The course of Moroccan history before the protectorate was seen as the efforts of the Arab government forces to impose themselves upon the Berber dissidents.

— "The Image of the Moroccan State in French Ethnological Literature: A New Look at the Origin of Lyautey’s Berber Policy" in "Arabs and Berbers: From Tribe to Nation in North Africa"

The dominant view regarding Bled es-Siba that was held by colonial scholarship was challenged by later scholars of decolonisation like Abdallah Laroui.

== Makhzen and Siba ==
The relation between the central power of the Makhzen and the region of Bled es-Siba was more complex than a simple territorial separation. Even though tribes in Bled es-Siba were not submissive to central power, the spiritual authority of the Sultan was always accepted.
