= Battle of Marrakesh =

1908 Battle in Marrakesh

Coordinates: 31°37′48″N 8°0′32″W

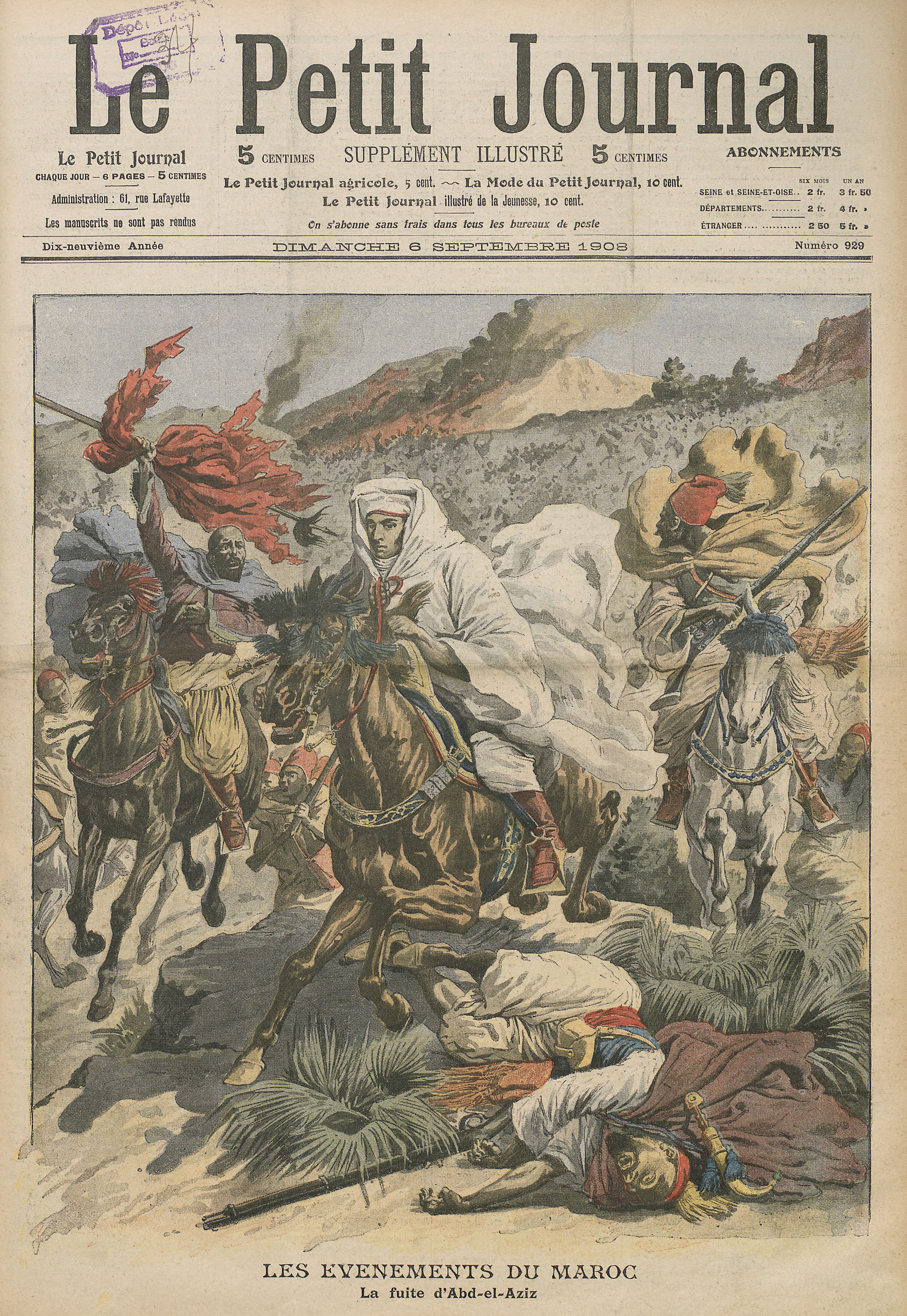
- Sultan Abd al-Aziz fleeing from the Battle of Marrakesh
| Date | 19 August 1908 |
| Location | Near Marrakesh, Morocco |
| Result | Abdel-hafid victory |

Belligerents
| Sultan's forces | Abd al-Hafid's forces |

Commanders and leaders
| Abd al-Aziz | Abd al-Hafid; Allal al-Glawi |

The Battle of Marrakesh was a central battle in the Hafidiya, in which Abd al-Hafid seized power from his brother Abd al-Aziz, fought outside Marrakesh, Morocco on 19 August 1908. A battalion led by Abd al-Aziz departed from Rabat and was ambushed and defeated on its approach to Marrakesh by forces loyal to Abd al-Hafid.

== Background ==
In May 1907 the southern aristocrats, led by the head of the Glaoua tribe Si Madani El Glaoui, invited Abd al-Hafid, an elder brother of Abd al-Aziz, and viceroy at Marrakesh, to become sultan, and the following August, Abd al-Hafid was proclaimed sultan there with all the usual formalities.

On 5 August 1907, France bombarded and occupied Casablanca after the death of Europeans in a riot incited by the implementation of measures of the Treaty of Algeciras. In September, Abd al-Aziz arrived at Rabat from the capital, Fez, and endeavored to secure the support of the European powers against his brother. From France he accepted the grand cordon of the Legion of Honour, and was later enabled to negotiate a loan. This was seen as leaning to Christian support and aroused further opposition to his rule, and in January 1908 he was declared deposed by the ulama of Fes, who offered the throne to Abd al-Hafid.

== Battle ==
After months of inactivity Abd al-Aziz made an effort to restore his authority, and quitting Rabat in July he marched on Marrakesh. His force, largely owing to treachery, was completely overthrown on 19 August when nearing that city, The battle took place in an area called Bou Ajiba between the qaid of Demnat, Allal al-Glawi, and Abd al-Aziz. After the battle, Abd al-Aziz managed to escape unharmed despite his djellaba being pierced with bullet holes. Two days later, he reached Casablanca and abdicated.
