= Tamassint =

- Town
- Location within Morocco
- Coordinates: 35°4′26″N 3°57′36″W
- Country: Morocco
- Region: Tanger-Tetouan-Al Hoceima
- Province: Al Hoceïma Province
- Elevation: 980 ft (300 m)

Population (2004)
  - Total: 1,788
- Time zone: UTC+0 (GMT)

Tamassint is a village in Al Hoceïma Province, Tanger-Tetouan-Al Hoceima, Morocco. According to the 2004 census it has a population of 1788.

== History ==
Raisuli was imprisoned here after his defeat against Abdelkrim in 1925 until his death.
