= Harry Aubrey de Vere Maclean =

British general (1848–1920)

General Sir Harry Aubrey de Vere Maclean KCMG
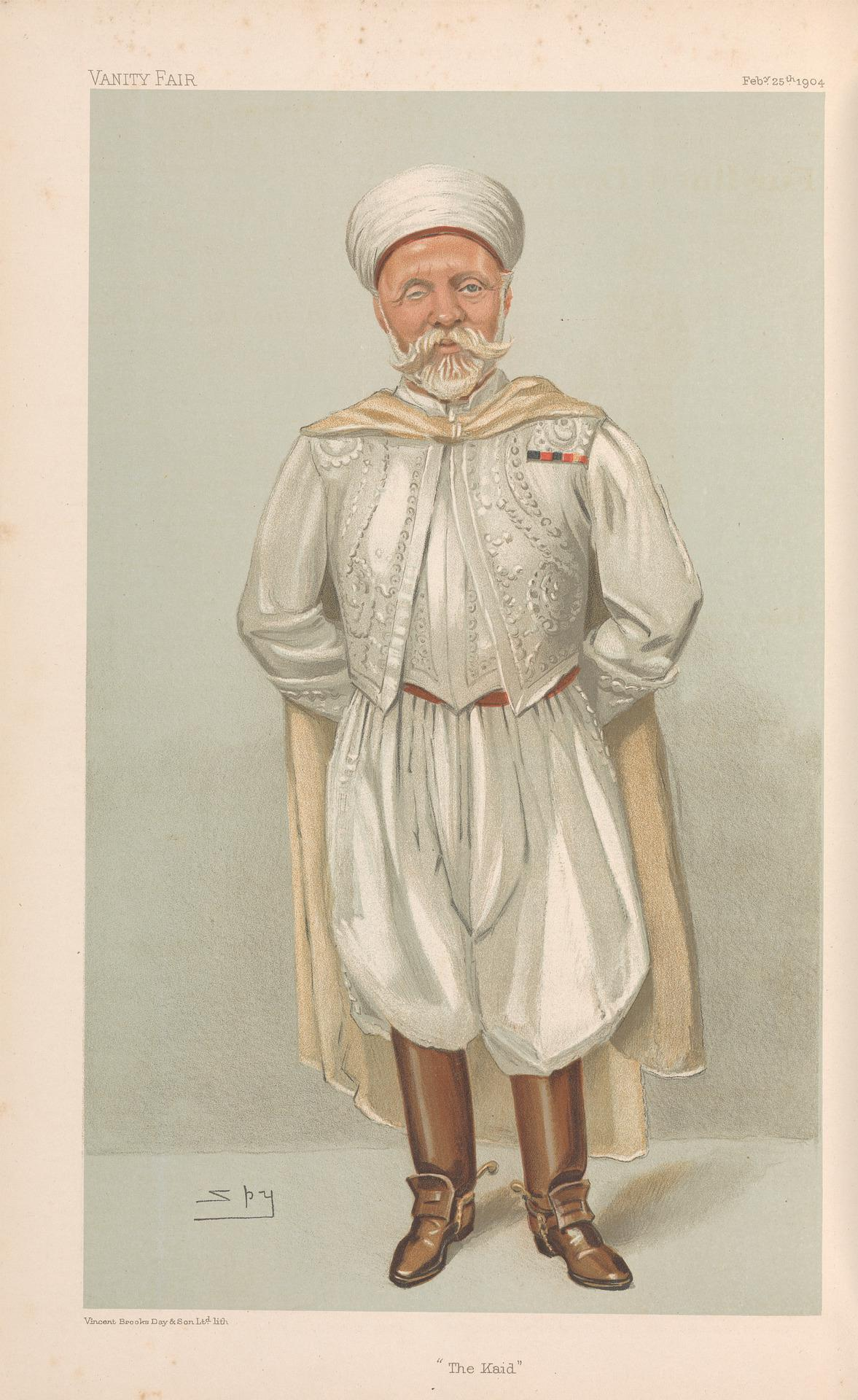
- Born: 15 June 1848
- Died: 1920 (aged 71–72)
- Military career
- Allegiance: Army of Morocco, United Kingdom
- Service years: 1869 – 1876
- Rank: General
- Awards: Knight Commander of the Order of St Michael and St George

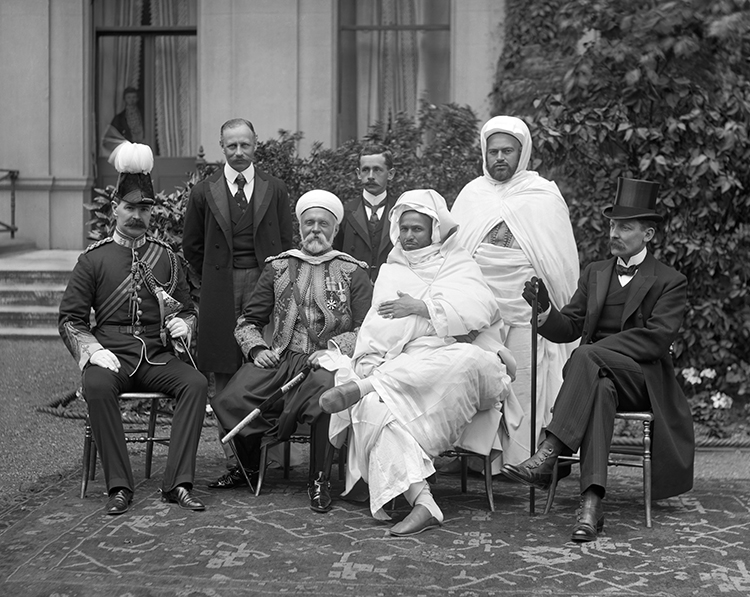
Left to right: Colonel Bernard Ramsden James (1864–1938) Intelligence Office and Soldier; Allan Maclean (1858–1918) Diplomat; Kaïd, General Sir Harry Aubrey de Maclean (1848–1920) Soldier and Instructor to the Moroccan army; Alfred Irwin (1865–1921) Interpreter; Hadj el'Arbi bel-Mehdi el-Menebhi Moroccan Minister of War and Emissary of Sultan Moulai Abdul Aziz; Sid Abderrahman Bargash Diplomat; Sir Robert Follett Synge (1853–1920) Marshal of Ceremonies

General (Kaïd) Sir Harry Aubrey de Vere Maclean, KCMG (15 June 1848 – 5 February 1920) was a Scottish soldier, and instructor to the Moroccan Army.

== Military career ==
Maclean was born on 15 June 1848, the eldest son of General Andrew Maclean.

He began his military career in the 69th (South Lincolnshire) Regiment of Foot in 1869. He was dispatched overseas to fight the Fenians in Canada. In 1876 he resigned from his regiment, and the following year he went to Morocco and began his career as an army instructor for the Sultan Mulai Hassan. He gained the trust of the Sultan of Morocco and his successor Moulay Abdelaziz through his service and fought against opposing tribes throughout Morocco. During his career, he was kidnapped and held for ransom after a failed first attempt. He visited the forbidden city of Tafilalt, and eventually became commander of the Sultan of Morocco's Army.

Although he was loyal to his employer to a fault, he was regarded as an unofficial British agent in the United Kingdom. In June 1901 he was attached to a Special diplomatic mission from Morocco to the United Kingdom to congratulate King Edward VII on his recent accession, and the King appointed him a Knight Commander of the Order of St Michael and St George (KCMG) during the visit.

== Life in Morocco ==
He was physically large and used this to his advantage when disciplining insubordinates. Although maintaining his Scottish personality and expert bagpipe skill, he adopted Moorish costume.

Various heirlooms of the Kaïd Sir Harry Maclean, including his ceremonial sword, pistol and Matriculation of Arms are now housed for the Clan Maclean Heritage Trust at the Isle of Mull Museum. His portrait, by Sir John Lavery, hangs in the bar of the El Minzah Hotel in Tangier. Maclean is buried in the graveyard of St Andrew's Church, Tangier.

== Family ==
Maclean was married twice. His first wife was Catherine Coe, but he divorced her in 1905, and re-married in 1913 Ella Prendergast, daughter of General Sir Harry Prendergast. One of his sons was Andrew de Vere Maclean, who followed his father in the British Army.

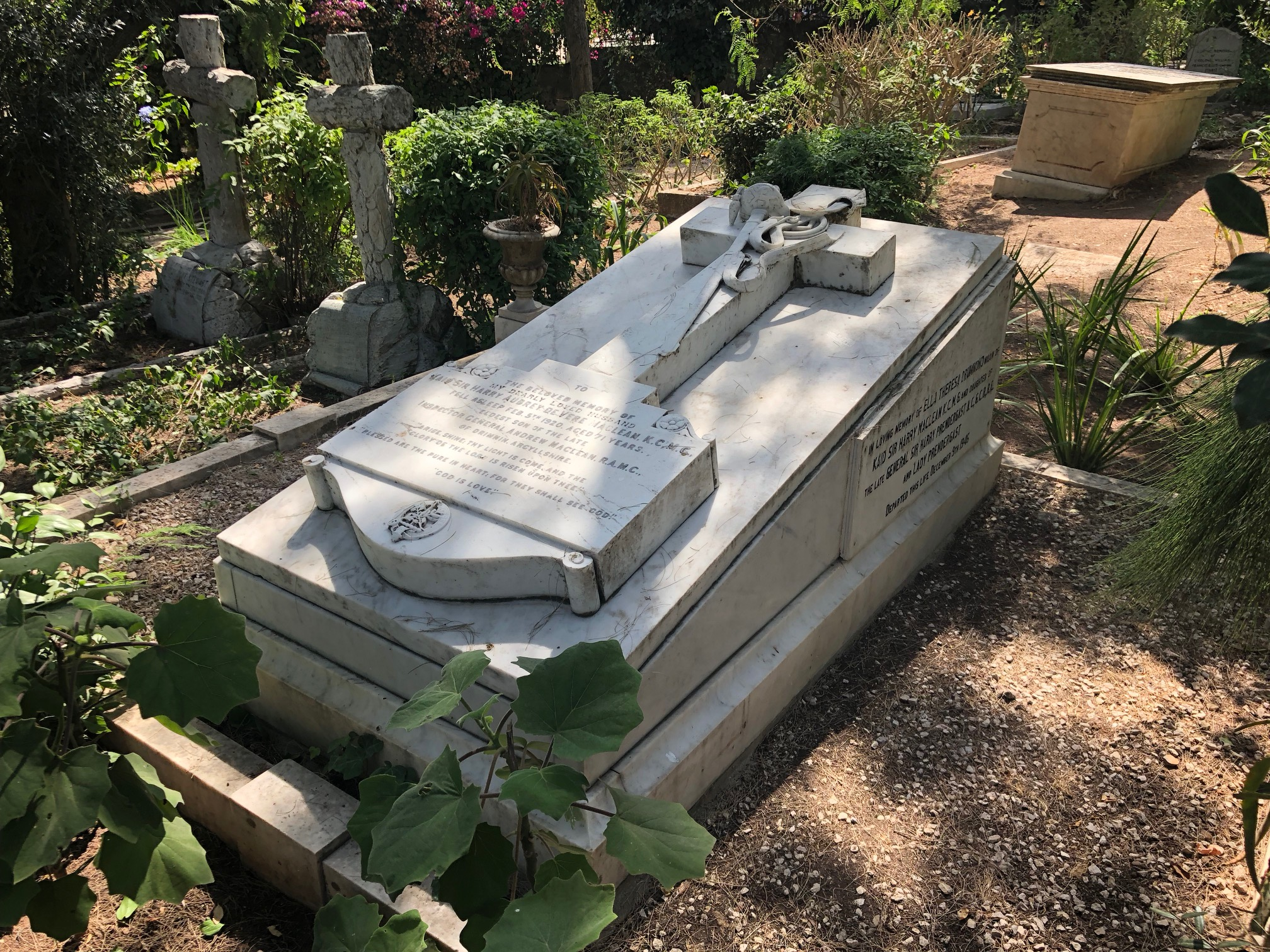
Sir Harry Aubrey de Vere McLean grave in Tangier

== See also ==
- T. E. Lawrence (Lawrence of Arabia)
- Dictionary of National Biography
