= Douglas Porch =

American military historian and academic (born 1944)

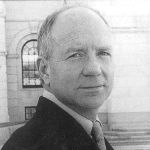
- Born: December 29, 1944 (age 81); Tallahassee, Florida, U.S.
- Education: Ph.D. from Corpus Christi College, Cambridge University (1971)
- Occupations: Military Historian; Professor
- Employer: Naval Postgraduate School

Douglas Porch (born December 29, 1944) is an American military historian and academic. He currently serves as a professor of National Security Affairs at the Naval Postgraduate School, and is the former Chair of the Department of National Security Affairs for the Naval Postgraduate School at Monterey, California.

== Biography ==
He obtained his Bachelor of Arts degree from the University of the South, Sewanee, Tennessee in 1967 and a Ph.D. from Cambridge University in 1972. He has been a professor of strategy at the Naval War College, a guest lecturer at the Marine Corps University, a post-doctoral research fellow at the École Normale Supérieure in Paris and the Mark W. Clark Professor of History at The Citadel.

Dr. Porch has written more than eight books and numerous other publications, mostly about French military history and French Colonialism. These books have been published in both French and English. In 1993 his book The French Foreign Legion: A Complete History of the Legendary Fighting Force received the Society for Military History's Distinguished Book Award.

== Bibliography ==
- Army and Revolution: France 1815–1848 (1974)
- The Portuguese Armed Forces and the Revolution (1977)
- The March to the Marne: The French Army 1871–1914 (1981)
- The Conquest of Morocco: The Bizarre History of France's Last Great Colonial Adventure, the Long Struggle to Subdue a Medieval Kingdom by Intrigue and Force of Arms, 1903–1914 (1983)
- The Conquest of the Sahara (1984)
- The French Foreign Legion: A Complete History of the Legendary Fighting Force (1991)
- The French Secret Services: From the Dreyfus Affair to the Gulf War (1995)
- The Wars of Empire (2000)
- The Path to Victory: The Mediterranean Theater in World War II (2004)
- Hitler's Mediterranean Gamble: The North African and the Mediterranean Campaigns in World War II Weidenfeld & Nicolson; First Edition (June 10, 2004)
- Counterinsurgency: Exposing the Myths of the New Way of War (2013)
- Defeat and Division: France at War, 1939-1942 (2022) [Armies of the Second World War series]
- Resistance and Liberation: France at War, 1942-1945 (2024) [Armies of the Second World War series]
