= Andrew Pritchard =

English naturalist and natural history dealer

Andrew Pritchard FRSE (14 December 1804 – 24 November 1882) was an English naturalist and natural history dealer who made significant improvements to microscopy and studied microscopic organisms. His belief that God and nature were one led him to the Unitarians, a religious movement to which he and his family devoted much energy. He became a leading member of Newington Green Unitarian Church in north London, and worked to build a school there.

== Early life ==
Andrew Pritchard was born in Hackney, then a village just north of London on 14 December 1804, the son of John Pritchard and his wife, Ann Fleetwood. He was educated at St Saviour's Grammar School in Southwark.

Pritchard was apprenticed to his cousin Cornelius Varley, an artist deeply interested in science. For his improvements in the camera lucida, the camera obscura and the microscope, Cornelius Varley received the Isis Gold Medal of the Society of Arts and later, at the Great Exhibition, he gained a medal for his invention of the graphic telescope. Cornelius's brother was the painter John Varley, but Pritchard would have seen more of Cornelius's son Cromwell Fleetwood Varley, an engineer who pioneered the transatlantic telegraph cable.

== Microscopy ==
Pritchard set up as an optician, and also sold microscopes and microslide preparations. These slides he prepared by studying the microscopic organisms that he saw, and identifying and labelling them. Starting in 1830, he collaborated with C.R. Goring to produce beautifully illustrated books showing the "animalcules" visible through the microscope. His shops were in central London, more towards The City than the West End, variously at 162 Fleet Street, Pickett Street and 312 & 263 The Strand. The Oxford Dictionary of National Biography says his List of 2000 Microscopic Objects (1835) "is very important in the history of microscopy... his History of the Infusoria (1841) was long a standard work, and the impetus it gave to the study of biological science cannot be overestimated." ("Infusoria" is a term then current for aquatic micro-organisms.) This latter book was enlarged and revised by John Ralfs and other botanists; Pritchard in turn condensed Ralfs's contribution on the diatomaceæ (diatoms, a type of phytoplankton), and wrote many books and articles on "natural history as seen through the microscope, on optical instruments, and on patents" He issued the exsiccata work British Mosses.

== Religious ties ==
Pritchard held various Dissenting religious views over his lifetime, holding that science and religion were one. Through the Varleys he attended a Sandemanian church, where he became acquainted with Michael Faraday. In the end, he joined a Unitarian congregation, because religious freedom and self-improvement were the watchwords of the movement, which still struggled against civil disabilities. Money aside, Pritchard would not have been able to attend an English university as a young man, for example, because the only two, Oxford and Cambridge, restricted entry to members of the Church of England. "No-one exists divorced from immediate and larger social environments. Dissenters led educational reform, especially in giving "lower orders" scientific knowledge and skill."

Pritchard joined the congregation of Newington Green Unitarian Church, an establishment long connected with scientific enquiry (Joseph Priestley), education (Mary Wollstonecraft), and political dissent (Richard Price). He is described in the church's history as "the leading member of the congregation". From 1850 to 1873, he was its treasurer, during which time donations doubled. Before the passage of the Elementary Education Act 1870, compulsory schooling did not exist, so the church started a school to offer education to the village children. He led the Newington Green Conversation Society, membership restricted to 16, a successor to the Mutual Instruction Society. Faraday was a frequent visitor.

== Death ==
Pritchard died in Highbury in London on 24 November 1882.

== Family ==
He married Caroline Isabella Straker in 1829 and they had several children. His wife was chair of the chapel organisation, and after a few decades there were 20 Pritchards involved in the chapel. Their son Henry Baden Pritchard (1841–1884) was a chemist, traveller, and photographer. Their son Andrew Goring Pritchard, a solicitor, was a leading light of the Association of Municipal Corporations; his son, Clive Fleetwood Pritchard, a barrister, became mayor of Hampstead; his son Jack Pritchard (1899-1992) co-founded the Isokon design company, famous for the Lawn Road Flats.

Andrew and Caroline's son, Ion (died 1929) and daughter Marian (died 1908), continued the work of their parents at the Newington Green Unitarian Church. The cause of liberal religion in general, and the development of the General Assembly of Unitarian and Free Christian Churches, were overarching themes. Ion was President of the Sunday School Association, one of the precursors to the General Assembly. Marian in particular is described as an unsung heroine, and "one of the leaders of modern Unitarianism". She set up Oxford Summer Schools for the training of Sunday School teachers, and Winifred House Invalid Children's Convalescent Home.

== Works ==
- 1830 with C.R. Goring. Microscopic illustrations of a few new, popular and diverting living objects with their natural history London, Whittaker, Treacher, & Co
- 1834 The natural history of animalcules : containing descriptions of all the known species of Infusoria : with instructions for procuring and viewing them London, Whittaker and Co.
- 1837 with C.R. Goring. Micrographia : containing practical essays on reflecting, solar, oxy-hydrogen gas microscopes; micrometers; eye-pieces, &c. &c. London, Whittaker & Co.
- 1847 MICROSCOPIC OBJECTS, animal vegetable mineral
- 1854 with C.R. Goring. Notes on aquatic microscopic subjects of natural history : selected from the 'Microscopic Cabinet' ...illustrated by ten coloured engravings London : Whittaker & Co.

== Sources ==
- Bracegirdle, Brian (1998) Microscopical Mounts and Mounters, Quekett Microscopical Club, London
- Nuttall, Robert (2006) "Marketing the achromatic microscope: Andrew Pritchard’s engiscope", Quekett Journal of Microscopy, 40:309–330.
