= Cornelius Varley =

British painter and inventor (1781–1873)

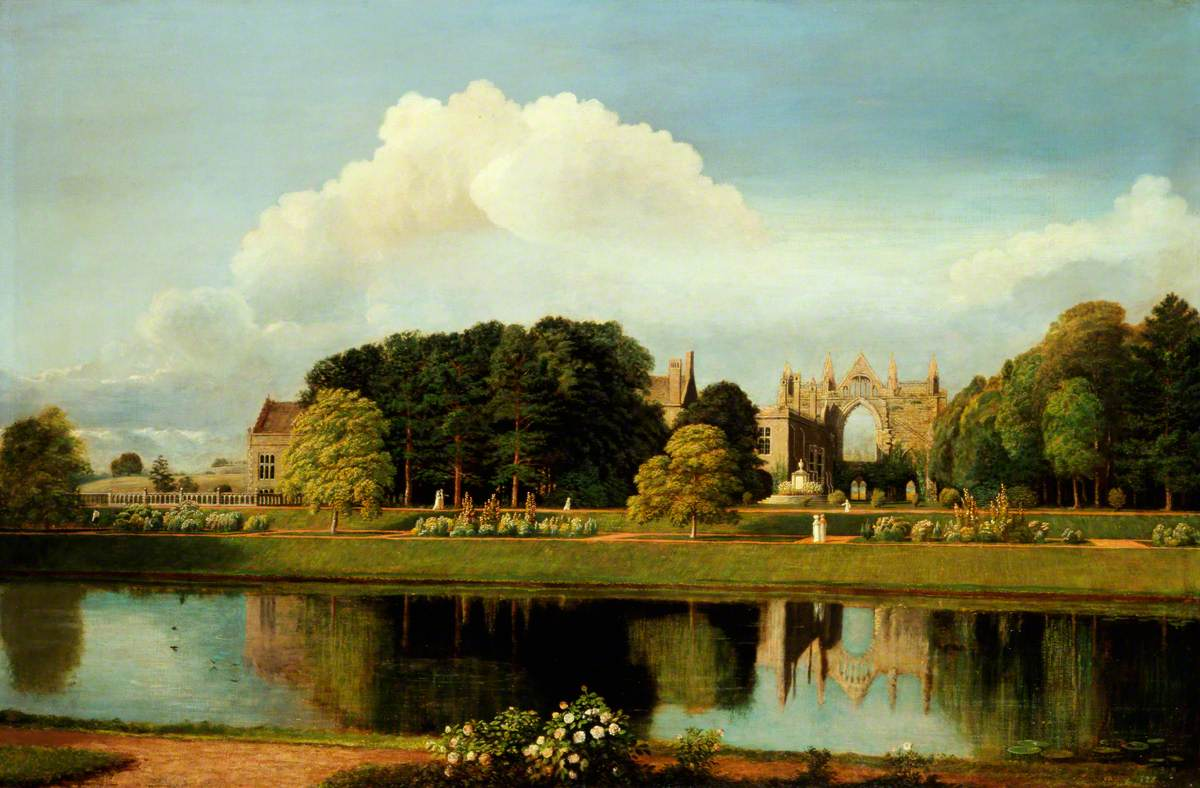
Newstead Abbey, oils, 1825, Government Art Collection

Cornelius Varley, FRSA (21 November 1781 – 2 October 1873) was a British painter, mostly in watercolour, printmaker and optical instrument-maker. He invented the graphic telescope and the graphic microscope.

== Biography ==
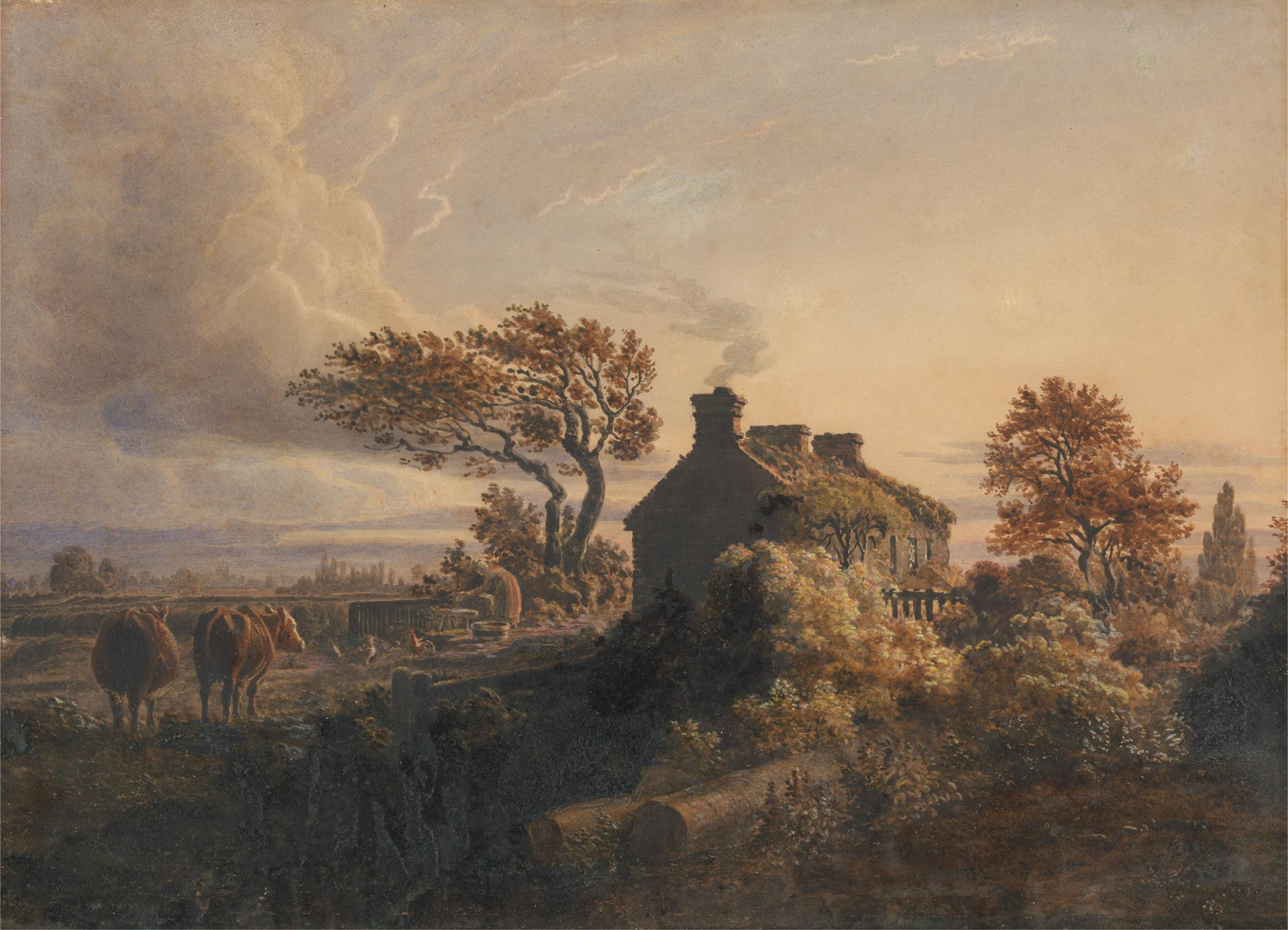
Evening, watercolour, Yale Center for British Art

Varley was born at Hackney, then a village north of London, on 21 November 1781. He was a younger brother of John Varley, a watercolour painter and astrologer, and a close friend of William Blake. He was educated by his uncle, a scientific instrument maker, and under him acquired a knowledge of the natural sciences. Around 1800, he joined his brother in a tour through Wales, and began the study of art. He was soon engaged in teaching drawing. From 1803 to 1859 he was an occasional exhibitor at the Royal Academy and he also contributed regularly to the displays of the Water-Colour Society, of which, in 1804, he was one of the founders, and of which he continued a member until 1821. He died in Hampstead on 2 October 1873.

== Works ==
Varley's non-scientific artistic works consist mainly of landscape watercolours; he was a founder member of the Old Watercolour Society, becoming the only founder-survivor left by the end of his life, although he had resigned in 1820, after the society divided. After this he devoted less time to landscape painting. He was "rejected unanimously" when he "rather surprisingly" applied to join the New Watercolour Society in 1844. His work has been described as "at once more traditional and more modern" than that of his brother: "his main interest seems to be in the building of his compositions from contrasting masses painted in even, unemphatic washes". He published a series of etchings of boats and other craft on the River Thames (Etchings of Shipping, 1809). He was the first person to make a telephoto image. As a printmaker, he was an early English user of lithography, though his works cannot be said to have made much use of the unique potential of the technique.

His life as an artist was deeply connected to his scientific and technical pursuits. His optical inventions were improvements to the camera lucida and camera obscura long used by artists, and allowed him to draw both landscapes and microscopic studies in lucid detail. He also patented and sold his inventions.

The Society of Arts awarded him silver medals in 1831 and 1833, and the Isis gold medal in 1841, for improvements to microscopes. His innovations included lever-controlled stages and an illumination-modifier.

Varley invented the graphic telescope in 1809, and patented it in 1811. Unable to find a manufacturer who would make it, he went into manufacturing himself; this was his main occupation from 1814 onwards. He exhibited the graphic telescope at the Great Exhibition, winning a medal, in 1851. His firm also manufactured telegraphic equipment and testing apparatus.

He published Treatise on Optical Drawing Instruments in 1845.

== Family ==
In 1821, Varley married Elizabeth Livermore Straker on 12 April 1821 in St. Giles Cripplegate, London, England. They had ten children including:
• Elizabeth Caroline Varley (b. 10 May 1822 St. Pancras, London, England);
• Cornelius John Varley(b. 27 July 1826 St. Pancras, London, England);
• Cromwell Fleetwood "C.F." Varley (b. 6 April 1828 St. John The Evangelist, Westminster, London, England), telegraph engineer (given name as Varley claimed descent from Oliver Cromwell and General Charles Fleetwood);
• Emma Mary Varley (b. 14 July 1830 St. Pancras, Somerstown, London, England);
• Samuel Alfred Varley (b. 22 March 1832 St. Pancras, Somerstown, London, England), electrical engineer;
• Theophilus Varley (b. 23 December 1833 St. Pancras, Somerstown, London, England);
• Amelia Varley (b. 4 April 1836 St. Pancras, London, England);
• Octavius Varley (b. about 1838 St. Pancras, London, England – Dec 1871);
• Frederick Henry Varley (b. 1842 St. Pancras, London, England – 1916).

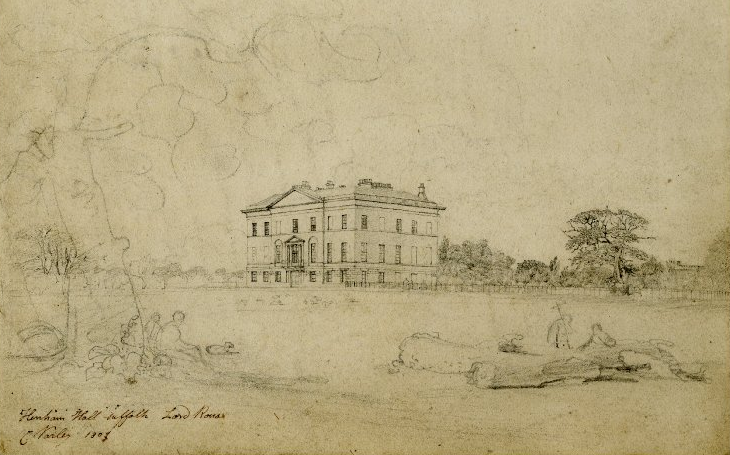
Henham Hall, Suffolk, England, 1801

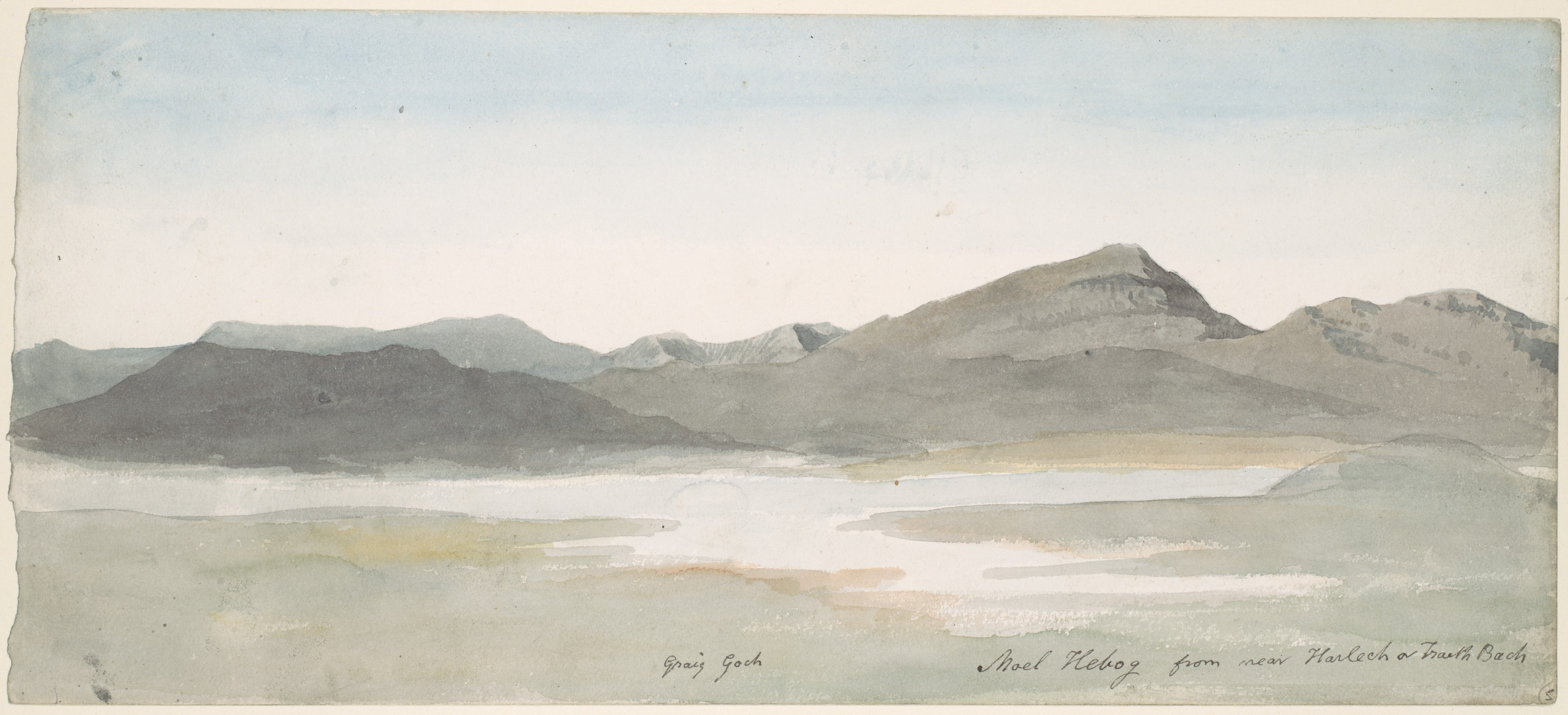
Craig Goch, Moel Hebog, North Wales, circa 1802

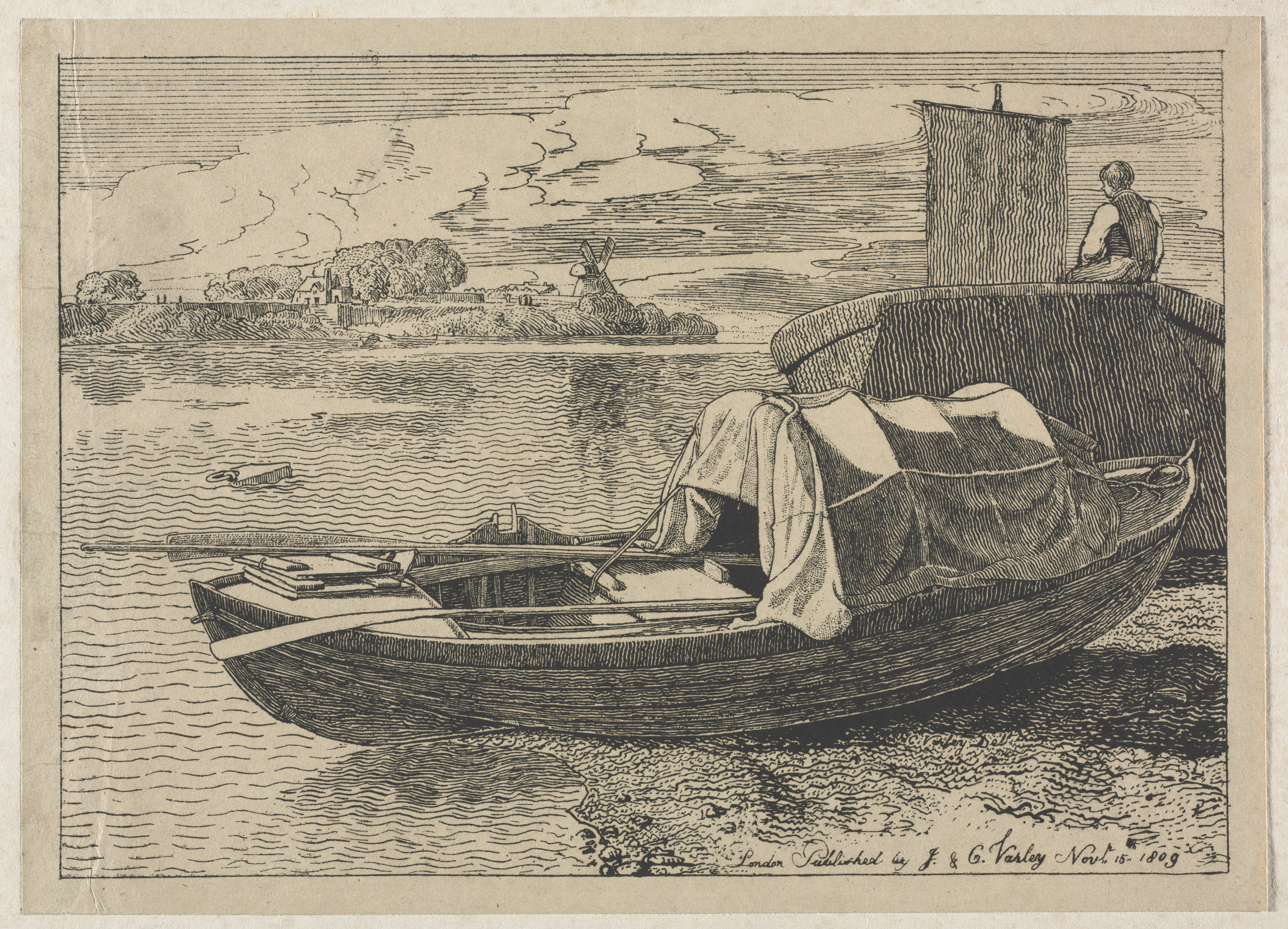
Boats on a River, Windmill in Distance. 1809 lithograph

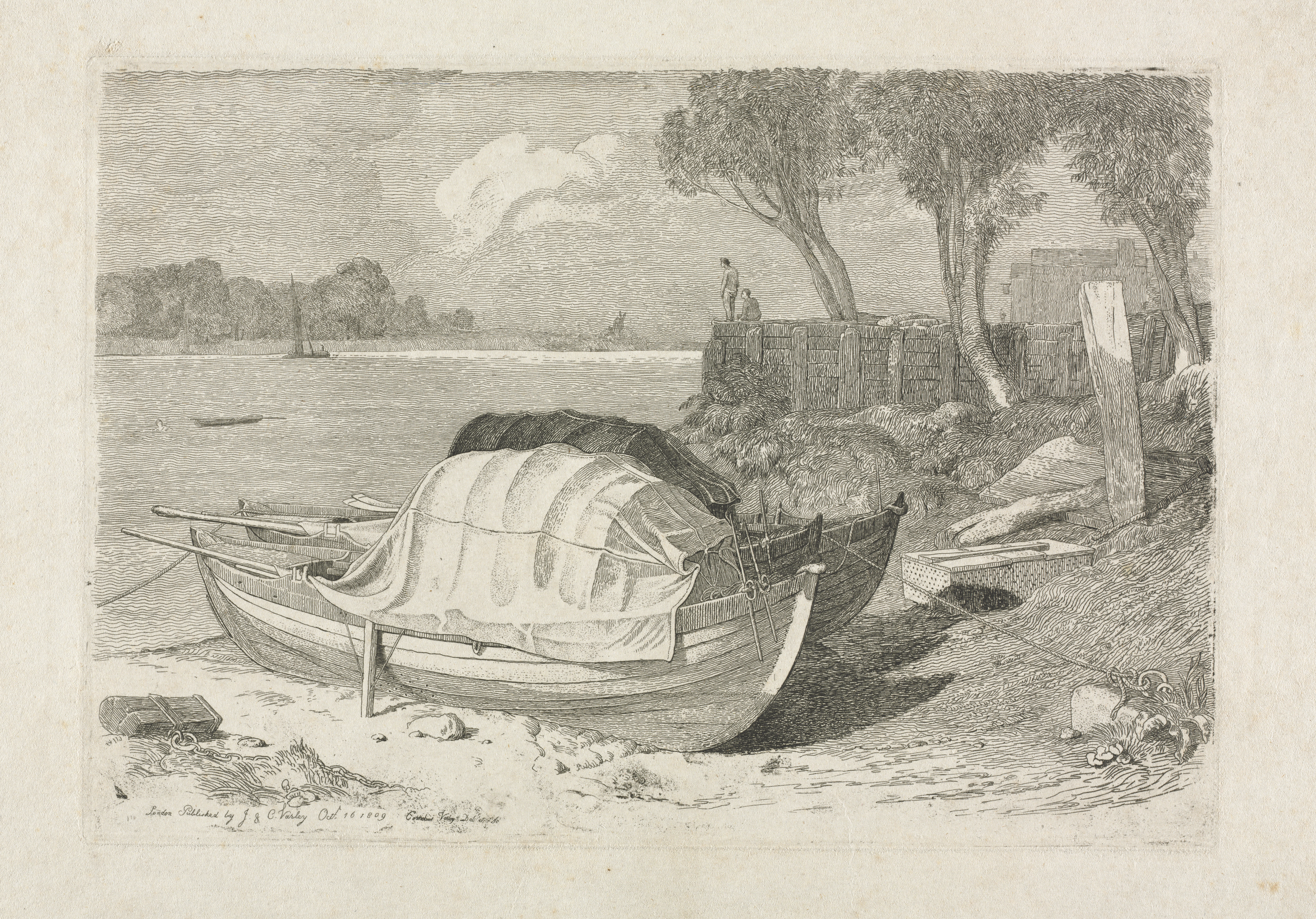
Two Beached Fishing Boats, 1809 etching

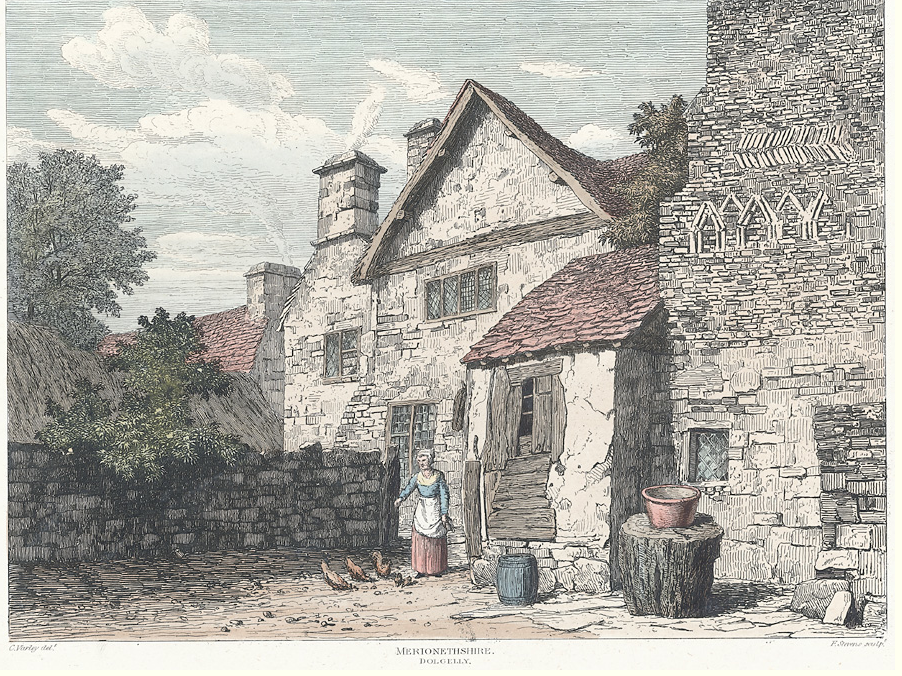
Dolgelly, Merionethshire. 1815

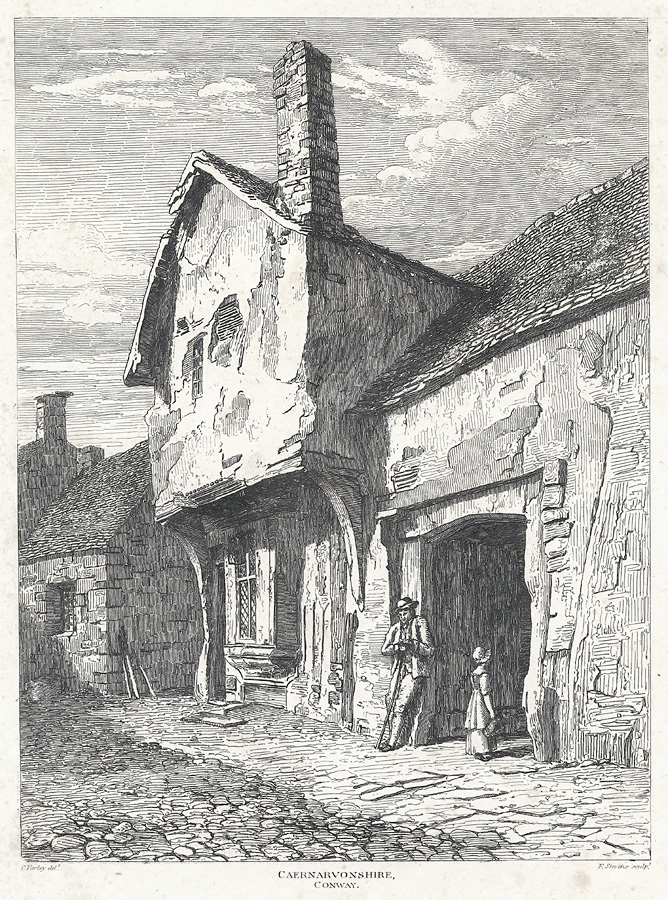
Caernarvonshire, Conway. 1815

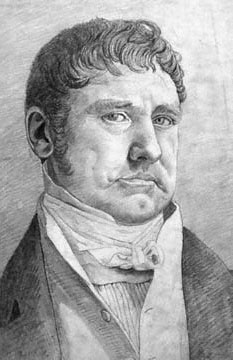
William Gell, by Cornelius Varley, 1816 (National Portrait Gallery).

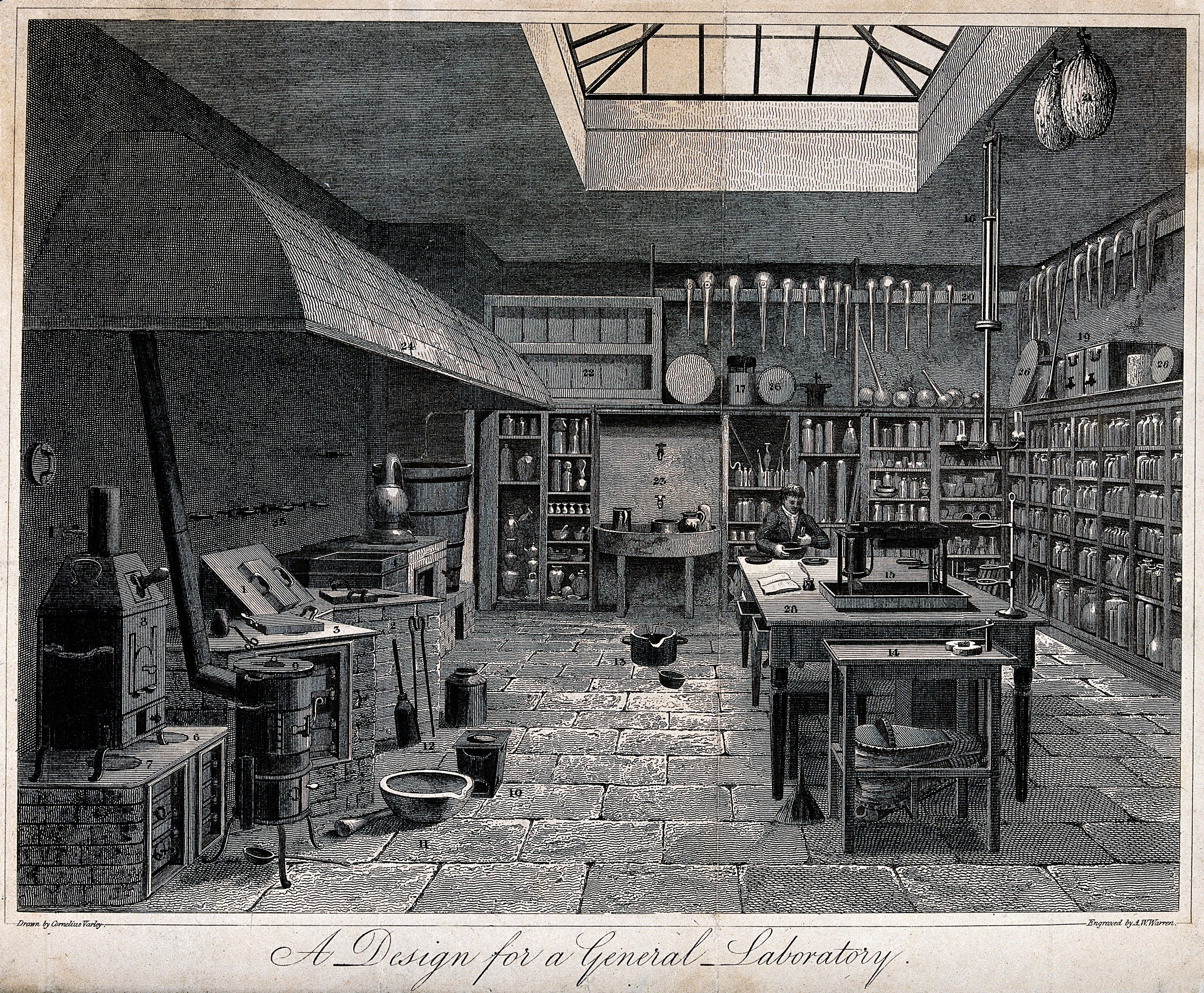
Design for a general chemical laboratory, with the apparatus. 1822

Drawing, Landscape with Figure in Foreground, c 1840. Illustration design for Samuel Roger's poem "The Pleasures of Memory"

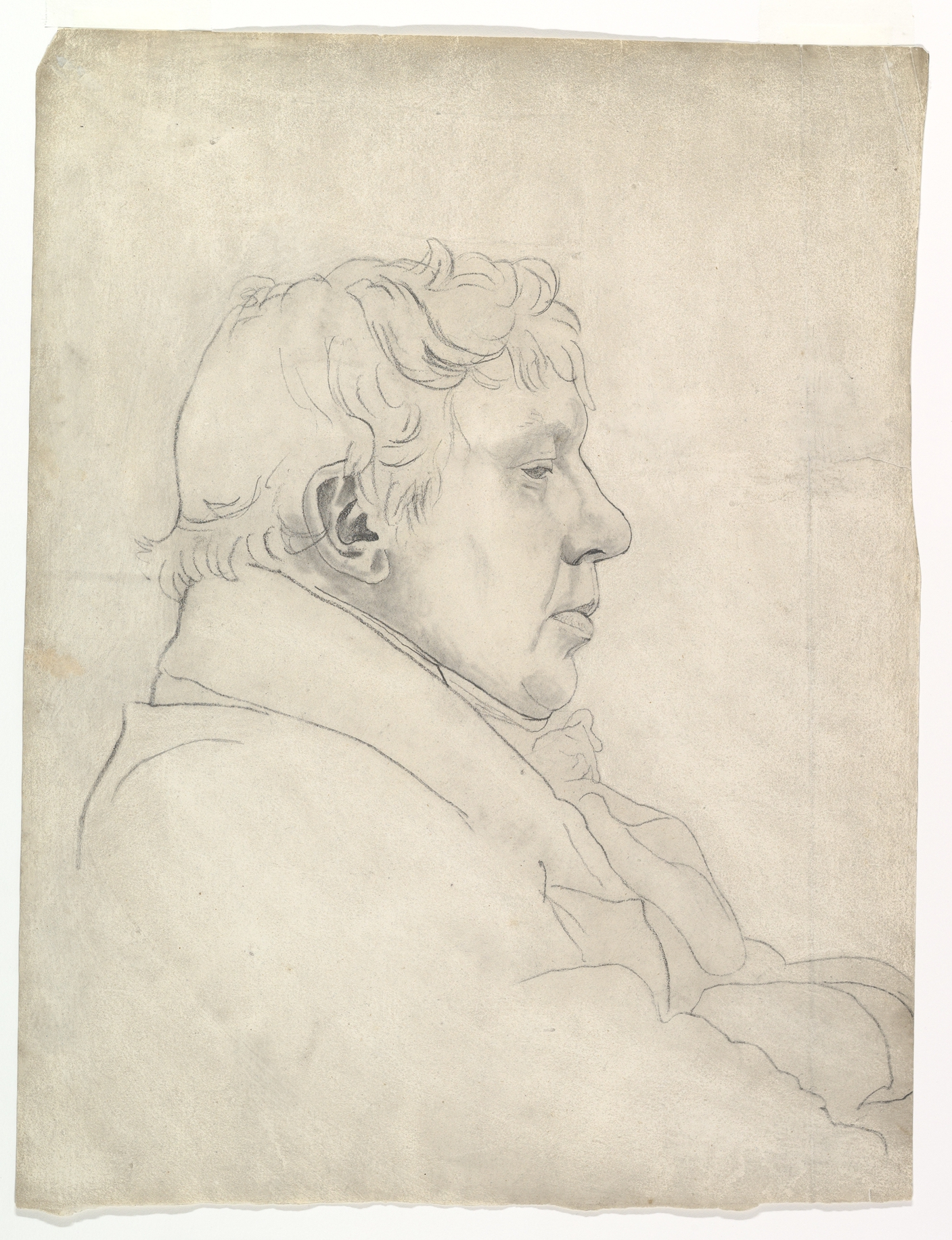
Portrait of a Man in Profile

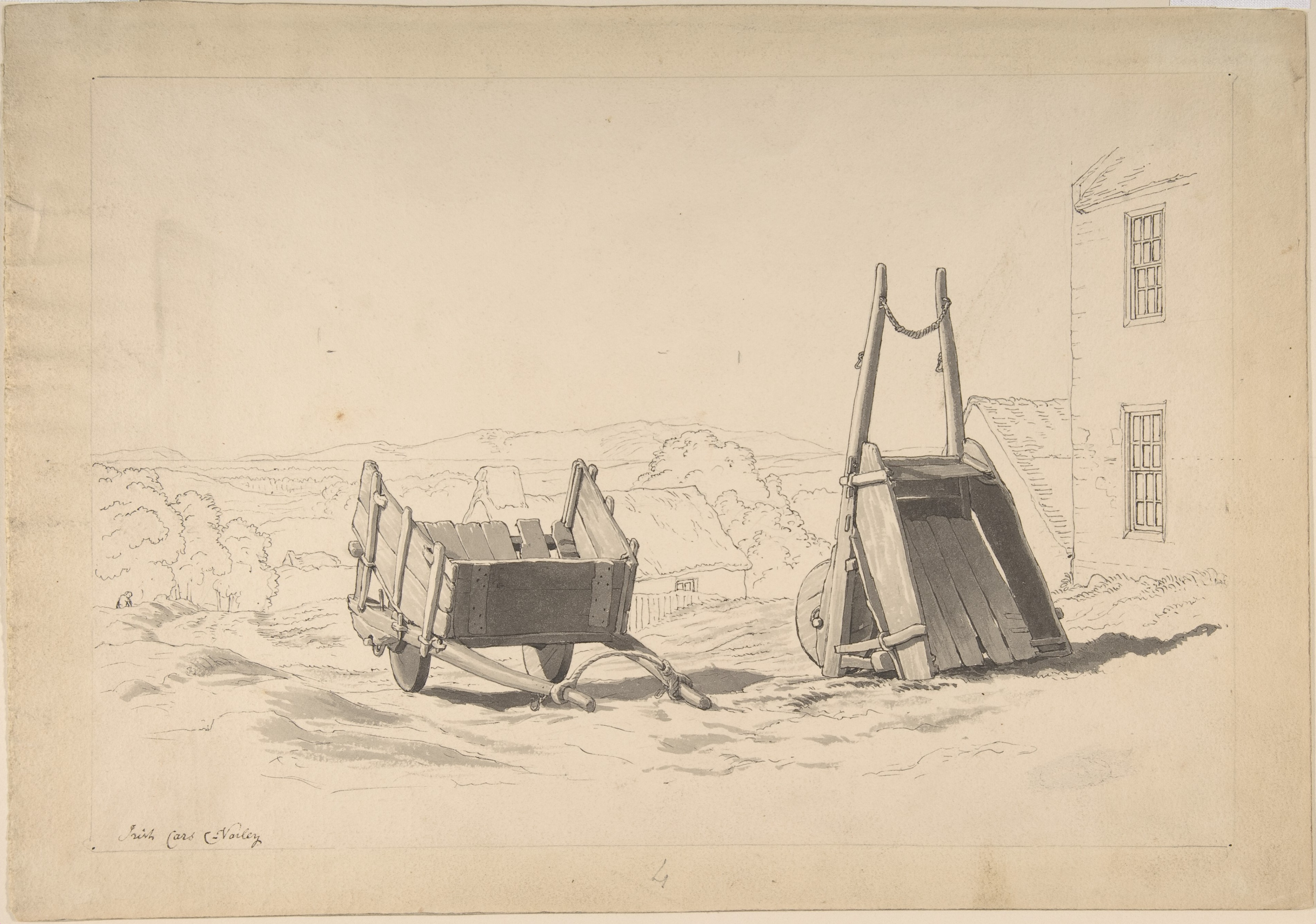
Irish Cars, date unknown

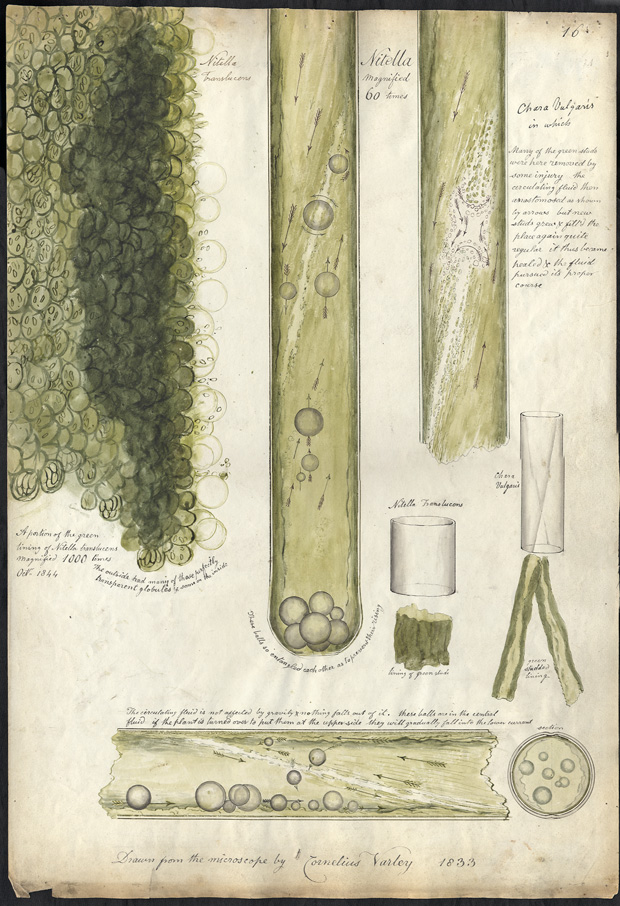
Nitella translucens & Chara vulgaris, micrograph, 1833. Chloroplast movement shown.

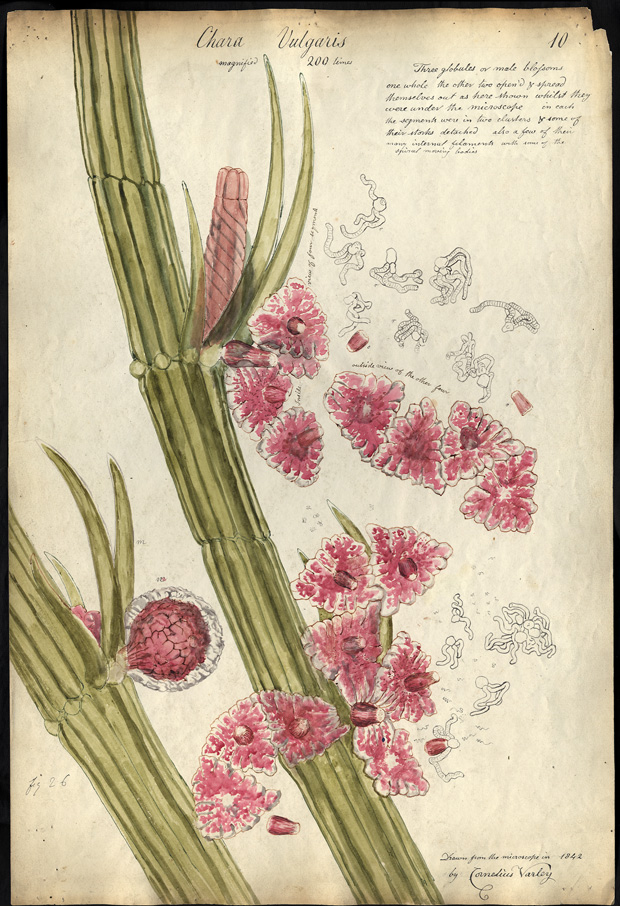
Chara vulgaris with three globules or male blossoms, 1842

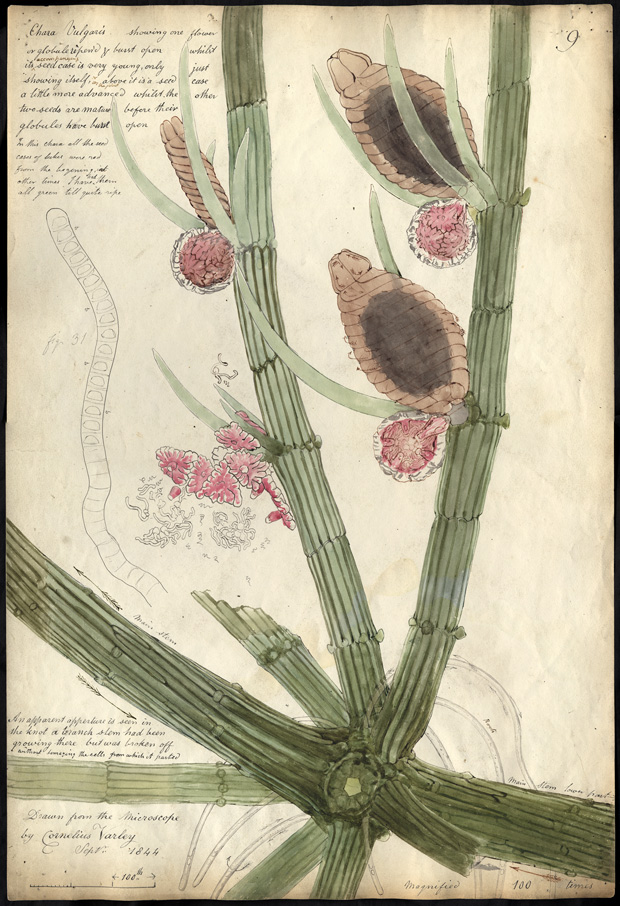
Chara vulgaris with one flower or globule open, 1844

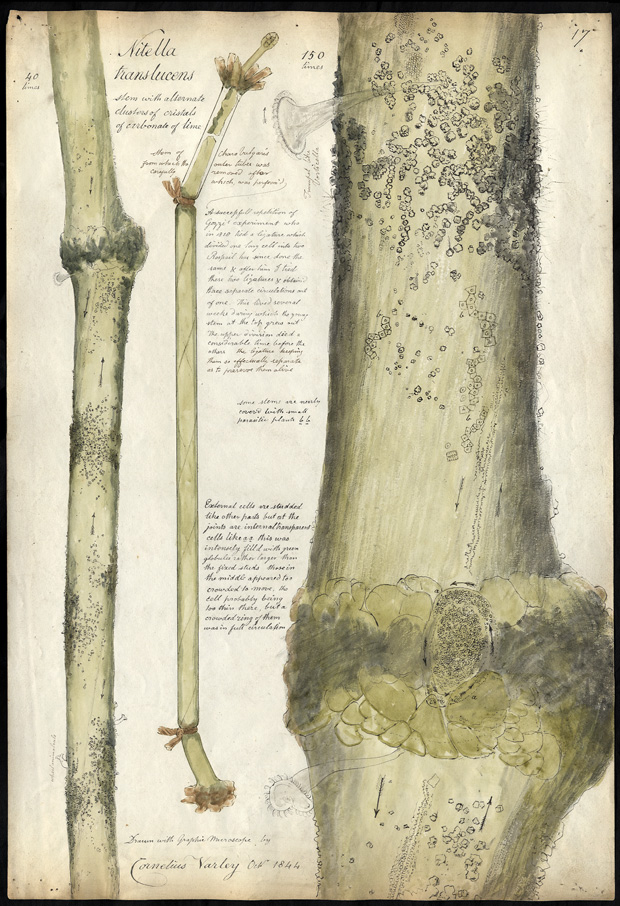
Nitella translucens, 1844. Cytoplasmic streaming is shown.

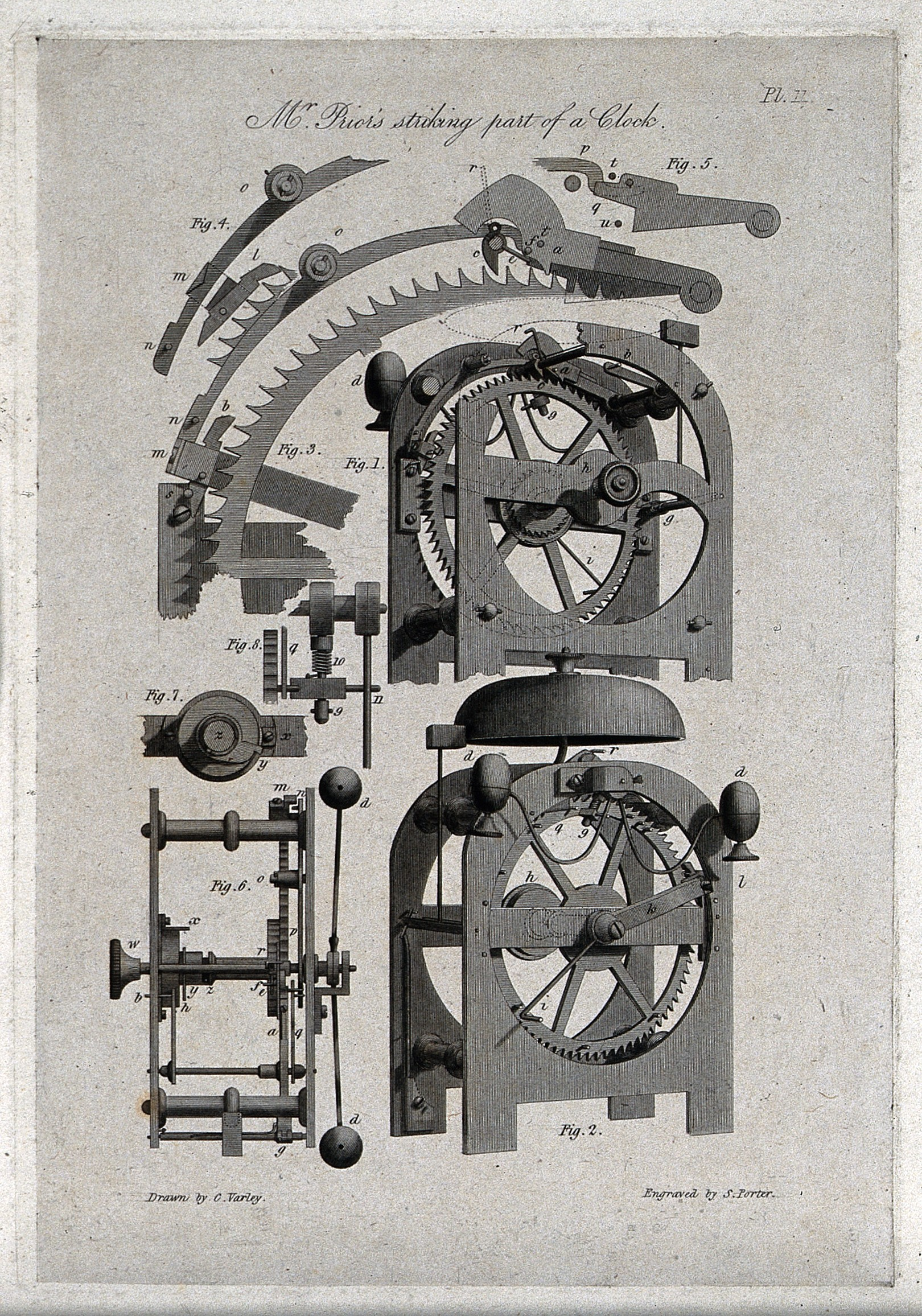
Clocks; a striking mechanism

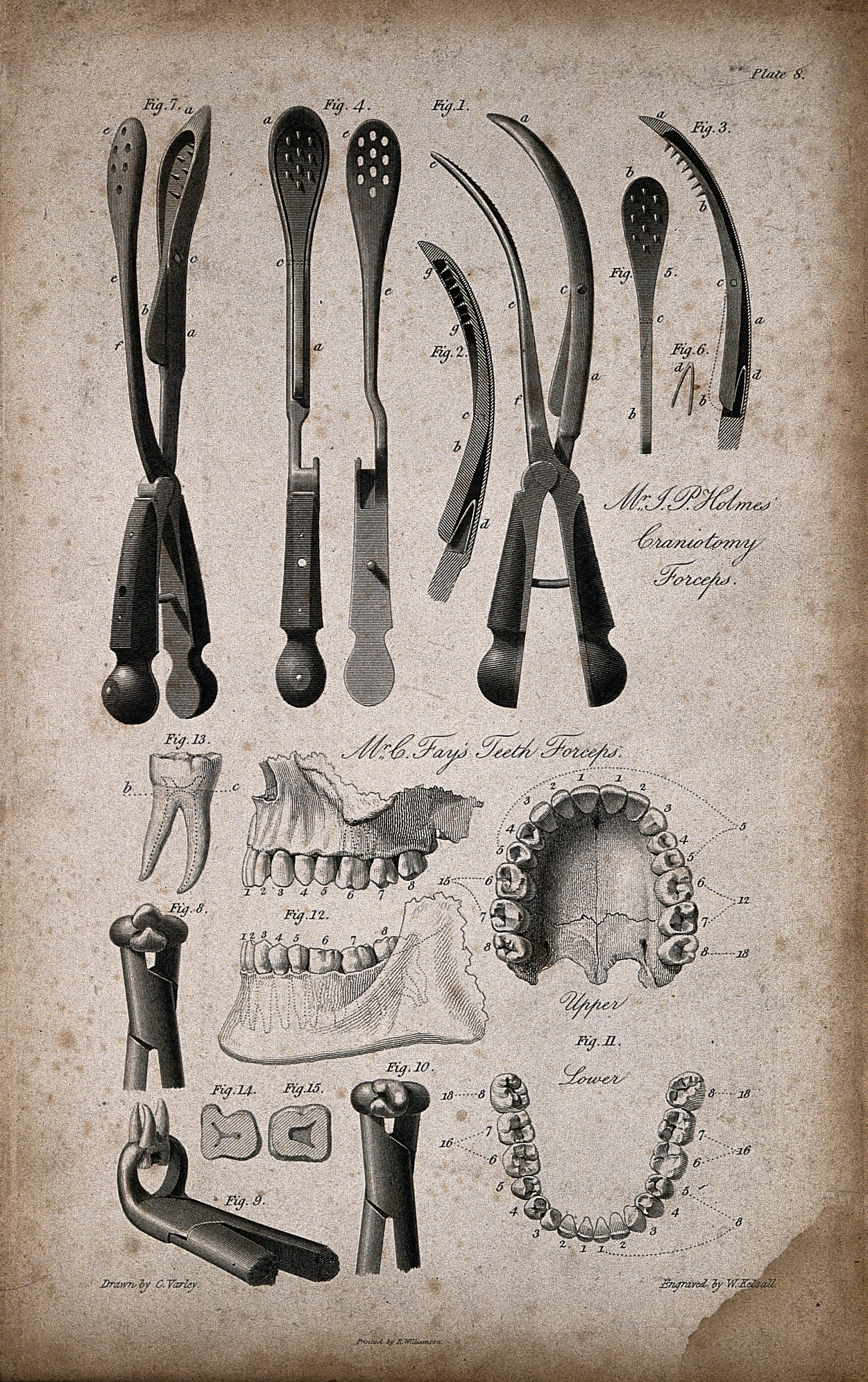
Surgical instruments

=== Legacy ===
A replica of Varley's graphic telescope was built for the Through the Looking Lens exhibition held at the American Philosophical Society Museum in 2013.

He was one of the co-founders and contributors of the Royal Microscopical Society.

His nephew Andrew Pritchard trained with him and became well-known as a micrographer.

== See also ==
- List of astronomical instrument makers
