= Ocular micrometer =

Device used to measure size of microscopic objects

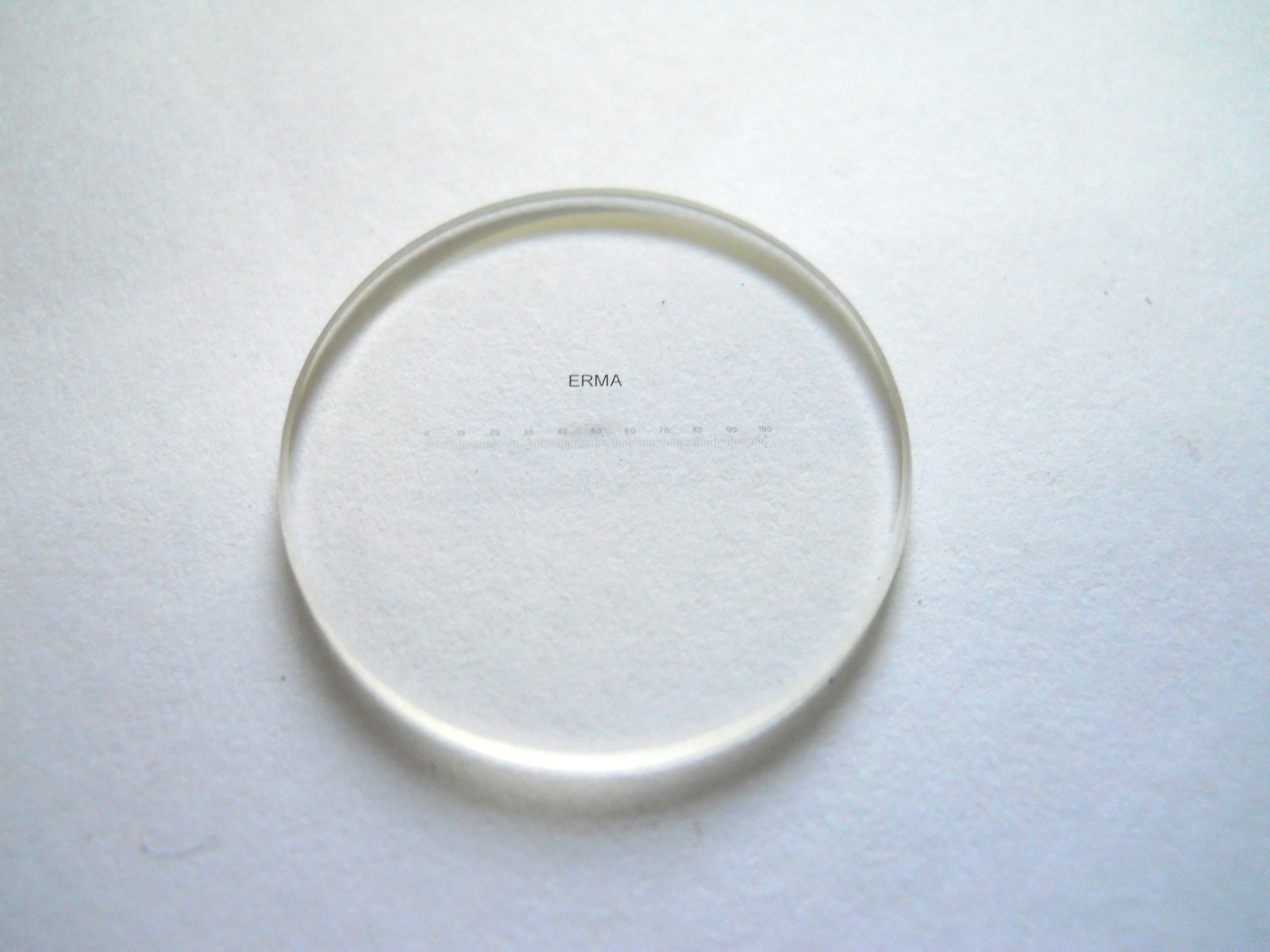
An Ocular micrometer

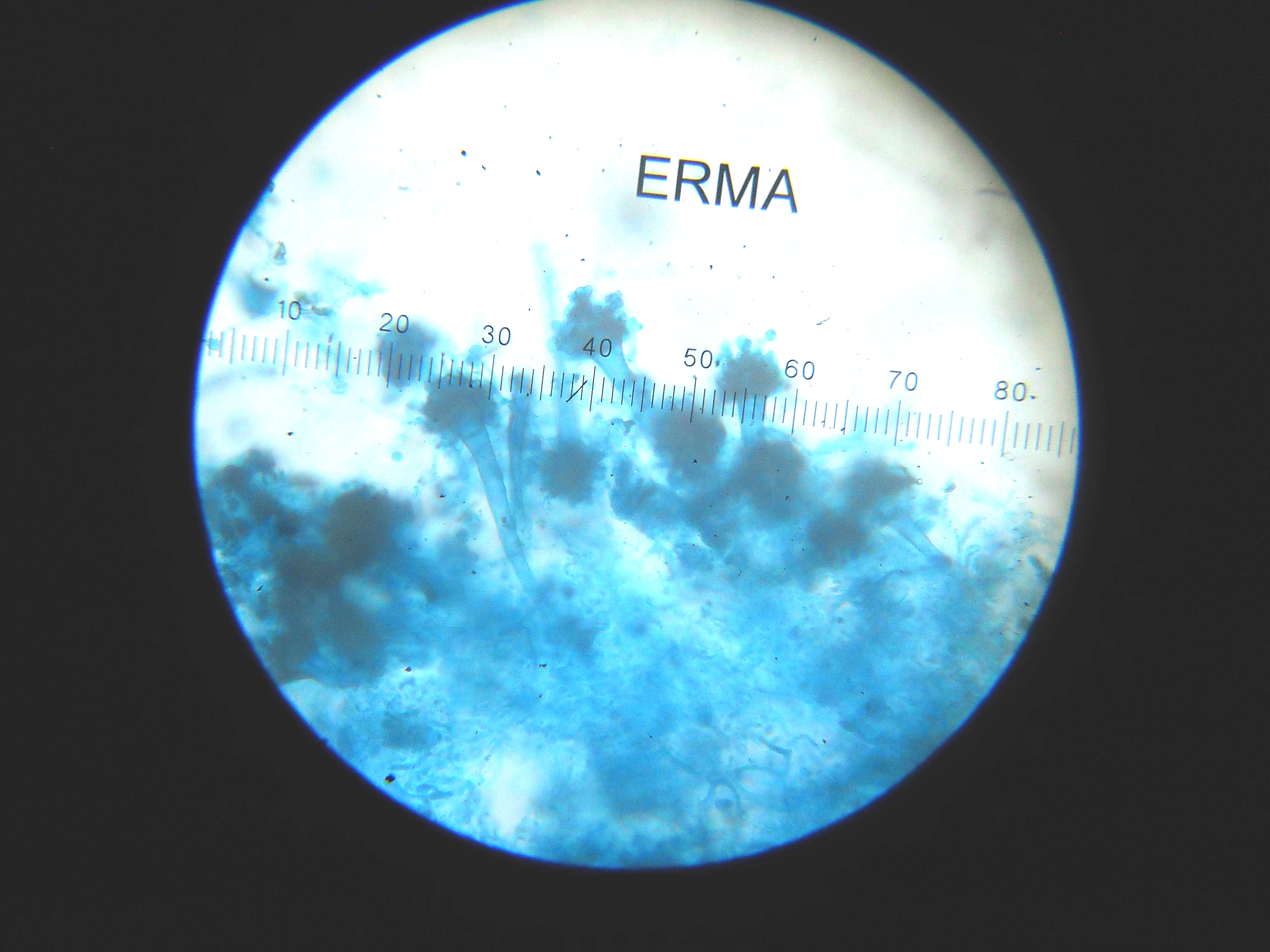
Microscopic Field showing an Ocular Micrometer scale

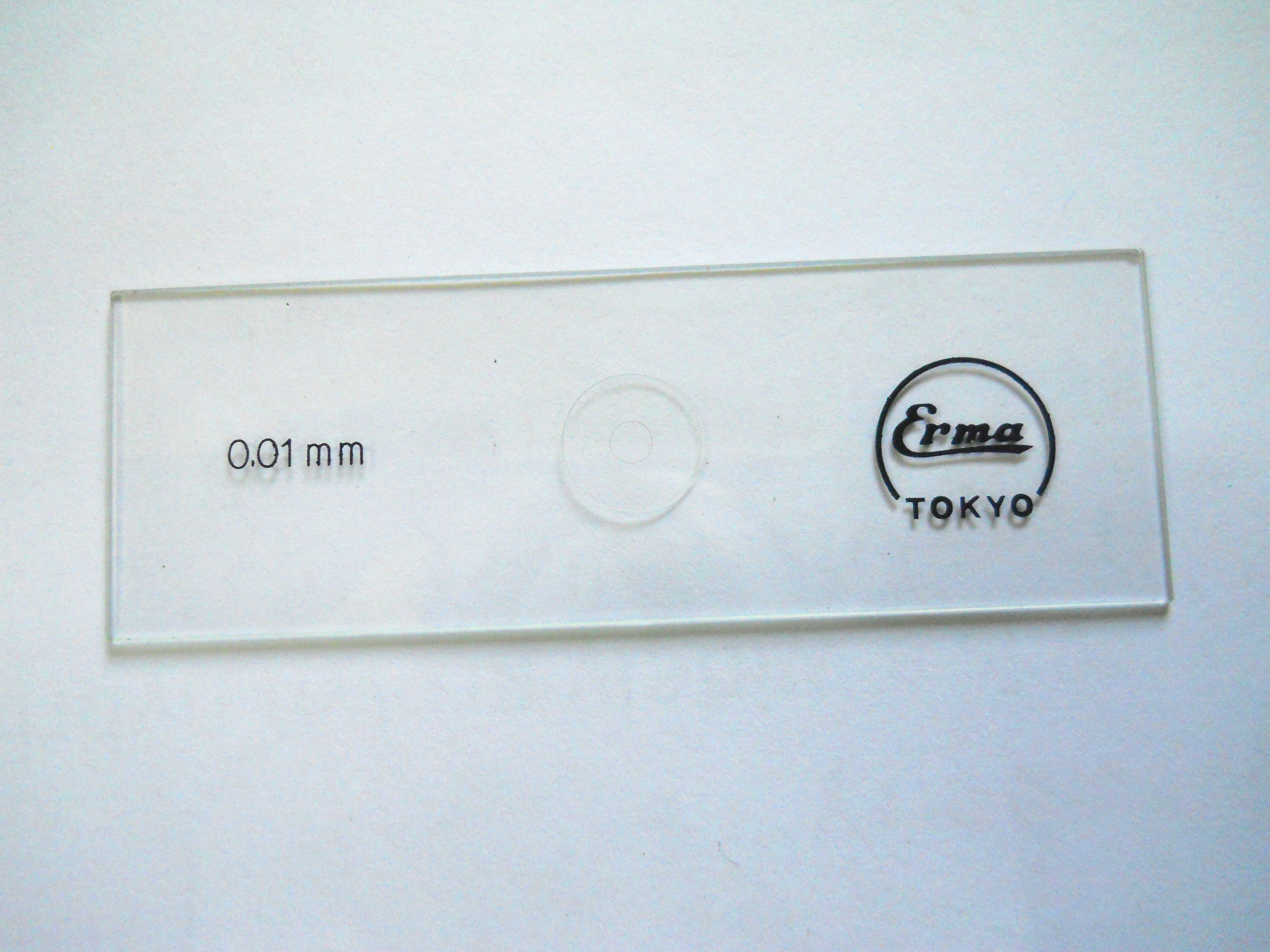
Stage Micrometer used in microscopic calibration

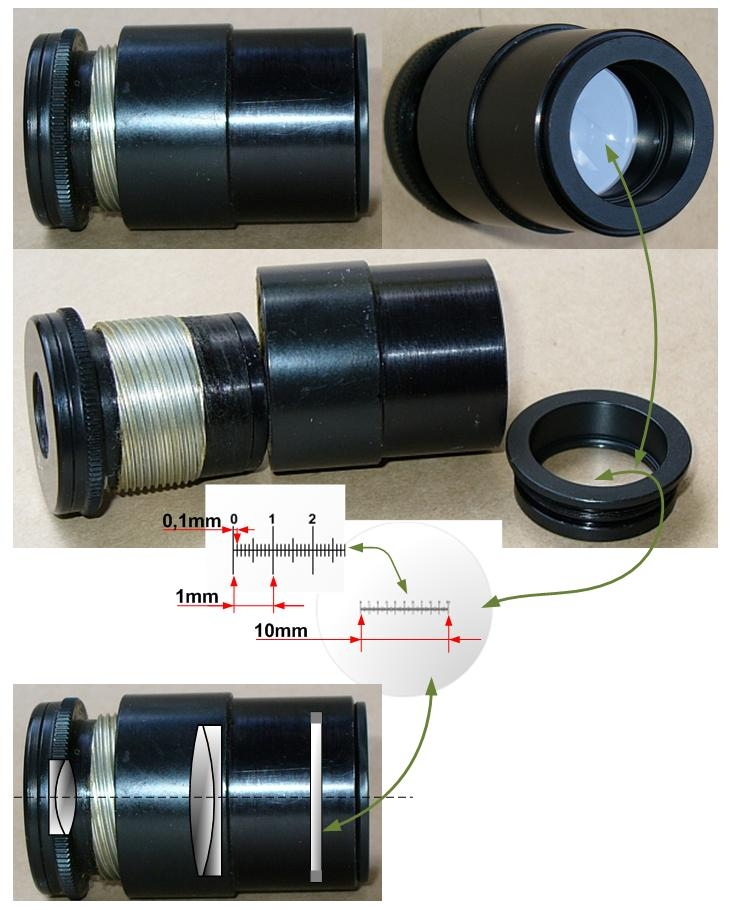
Ocular micrometer

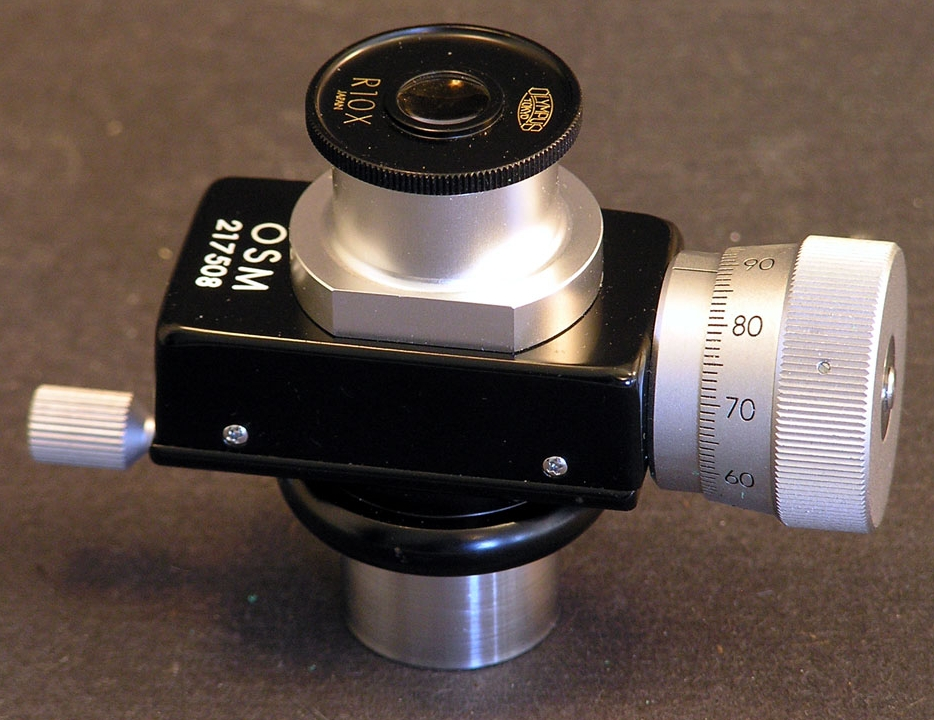
Micrometer Eyepiece

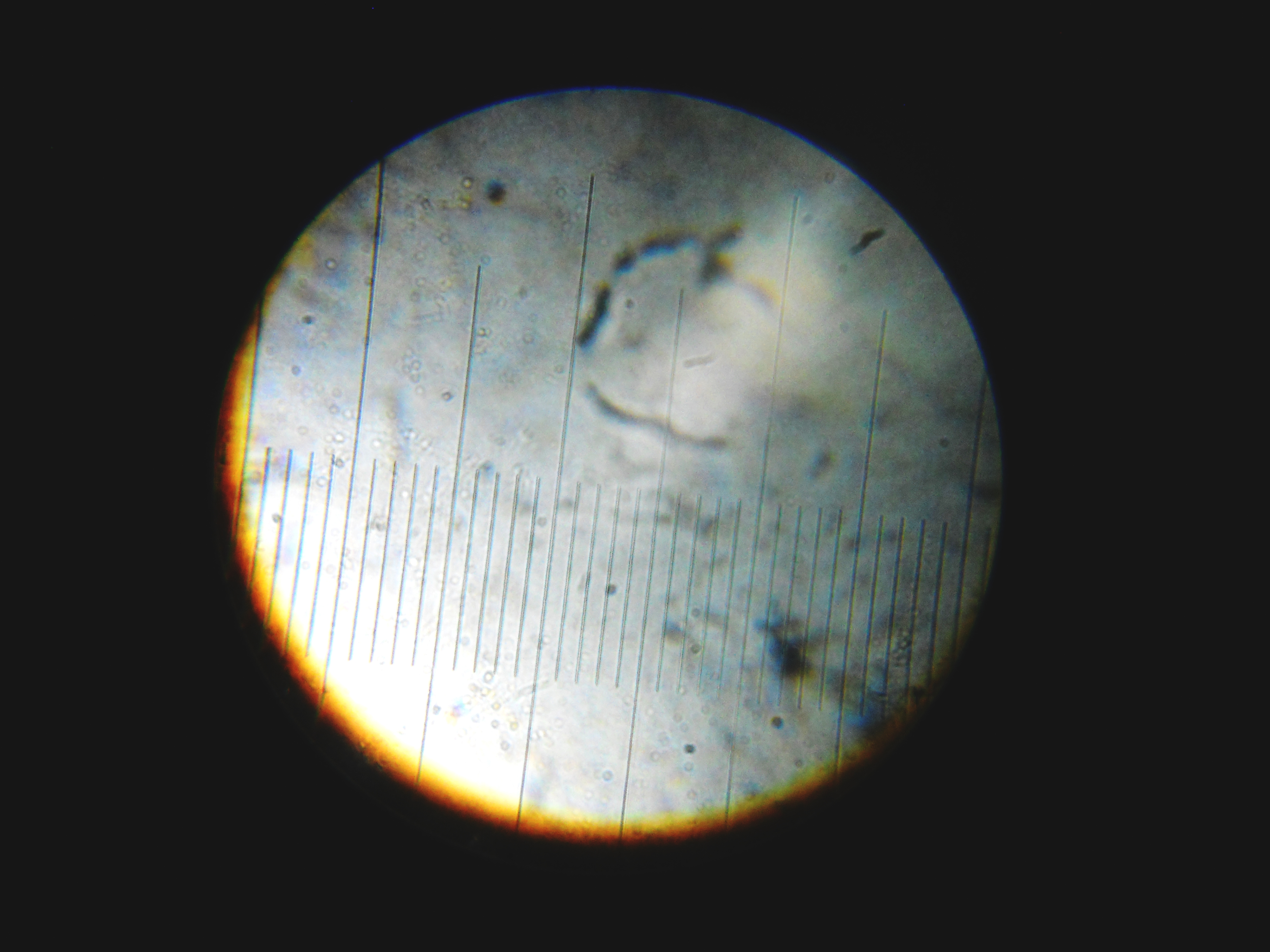
Stage micrometer divisions as seen under microscope. It is used to calibrate the ocular micrometer. Smallest division = 0.01mm or 10 microns.

An ocular micrometer or eyepiece micrometer is a glass disk, engraved with a ruled scale, that fits in an eyepiece of a microscope, which is used to measure the size of microscopic objects through magnification under a microscope. When the eyepiece micrometer is calibrated using a stage micrometer, the length of the divisions on the scale depends on the degree of magnification.

== See also ==
- Camera lucida
- Reticle
