= Samuel Alfred Varley =

English electrical engineer

- Born: 1832
- Died: 1921 (aged 88−89)
- Occupation: Electrical engineer
- Known for: Among the first to make a self-excited dynamo; invented compound winding for dynamos

Samuel Alfred Varley (1832–1921) was an English electrical engineer. He was one of ten children born to Cornelius Varley and Elizabeth Livermore Straker.

== Career ==
In 1852, Samuel started work for the Electric Telegraph Company in Manchester. His brother, C. F. Varley, had been employed by the same company since 1849. During the 1850s, Samuel was involved in supervising field telegraphs in the Crimean War. He also published papers on cable signalling. In 1861, Samuel took over the running of a telegraph factory in London, owned by his father.

== Inventions ==
In 1866, he was among the first to make a self-excited dynamo. Other contenders were Charles Wheatstone and Werner von Siemens. He also invented compound winding for dynamos.

In 1873, he read a paper at the Society of Engineers. The subject was "Railway Train Intercommunication" and he described a system fitted to the London and North Western Railway Royal Train.

== Family ==
In 1860, Samuel married Emily Andrews and the couple had seven children.

== Death ==
Samuel died at Abbottsacre Lodge, Abbott's Road, Winchester on 4 August 1921. His estate passed to his son Telford Varley (1866–1938).
