= C. F. Varley =

British engineer and inventor

Cromwell Fleetwood Varley FRSA
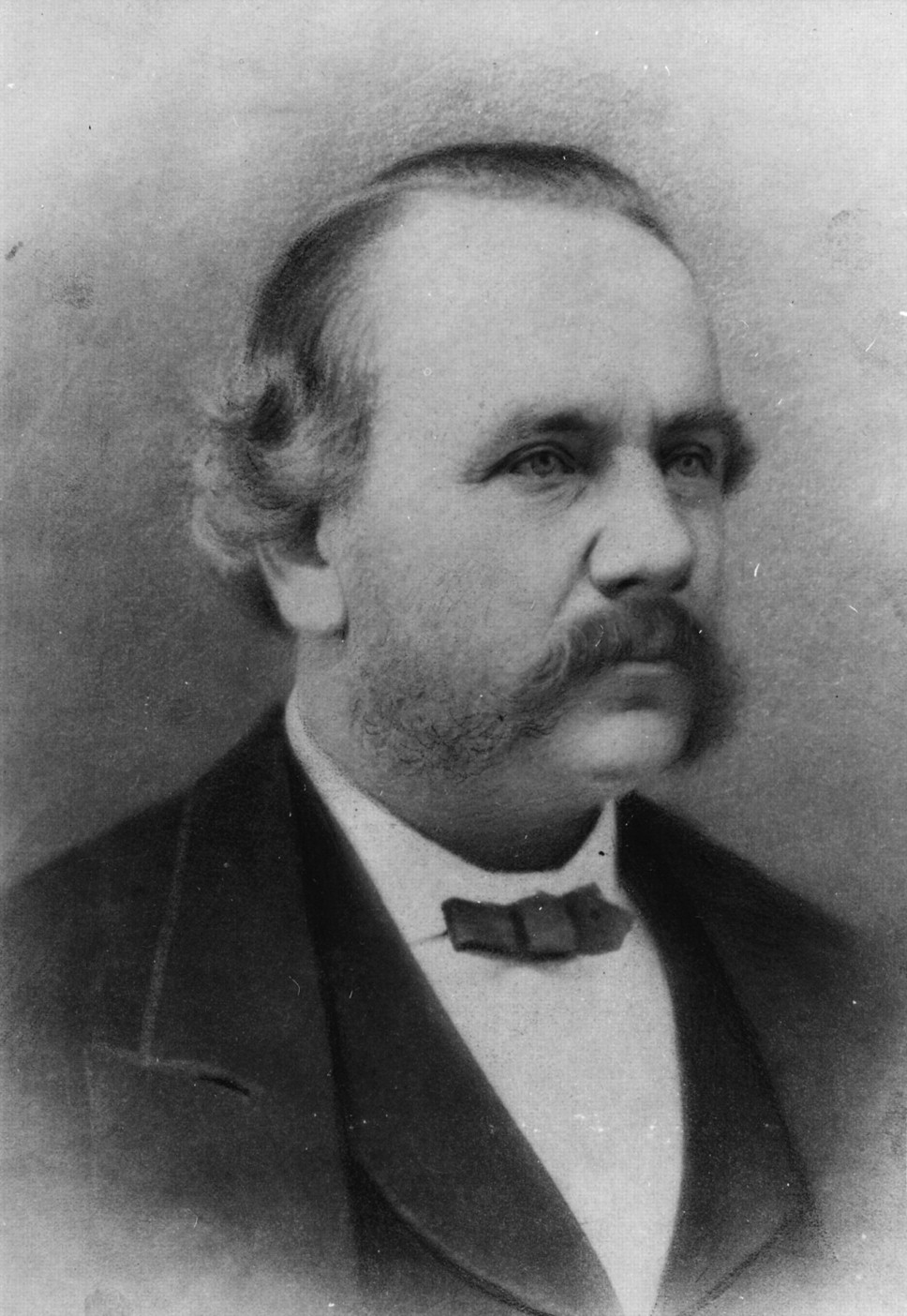
- Born: 6 April 1828
- Died: 2 September 1883 (aged 55)
- Occupations: Engineer, parapsychologist
- Known for: Varley loop test Kelvin–Varley divider
- Parent: Cornelius Varley
- Awards: FRS (1871)

Cromwell Fleetwood Varley, FRSA (6 April 1828 – 2 September 1883) was an English engineer, particularly associated with the development of the electric telegraph and the transatlantic telegraph cable. He also took interest in the claims of parapsychology and spiritualism.

== Family ==
Born in Kentish Town, London, Cromwell Fleetwood Varley was the second of ten children. His father was Cornelius Varley, an active member of the Society of Arts (now the Royal Society of Arts), best known for his scientific research. His mother was the former Elizabeth Livermore Straker. C.F. Varley's brothers, Samuel Alfred Varley and Frederick Henry Varley, were also improvers and inventors in connection with telegraphy. The family believed themselves the descendants of Oliver Cromwell and General Charles Fleetwood, hence his given names. The family were Sandemanians, part of the same congregation as Michael Faraday, but Varley did not continue his association with the sect into adult life. A first cousin was the microscopist Andrew Pritchard.

== Telegraph engineer ==
Varley joined the newly founded Electric Telegraph Company in 1846, becoming chief engineer for the London area by 1852 and for the entire company by 1861. He devised many techniques and instruments for fault-finding and for improving the performance of the telegraph. In 1870, he patented the cymaphen, a kind of telegraph that could transmit speech. The first transatlantic telegraph cable failed in 1858 and Varley was appointed to an investigative committee, set up jointly by the first Atlantic cable in 1858, he was appointed to a joint investigative committee established by the Board of Trade and the Atlantic Telegraph Company.

The committee reported in 1861 and resulted in a second cable in 1865, Varley replacing Wildman Whitehouse as chief electrician. Despite the difficulties of the second cable, it was an ultimate success and Varley developed many improvements in technology. Varley was an astute businessman and the partnership that he formed with the 1st Baron Kelvin and Fleeming Jenkin to exploit their respective telegraphic inventions yielded large profits for the three men.

== Spiritualism ==
He was sympathetic to the claims of Spiritualism and carried out investigations with fellow physicist William Crookes using a galvanometer to make measurements of the supposed phenomena.

== Cathode rays ==
In 1871, he authored a scientific paper suggesting that cathode rays were streams of particles of electricity. Varley believed cathode radiation was caused by the collision of particles. His belief was based on the idea that because the rays were deflected in the presence of a magnet, these particles have to be considered carriers of an electric charge. This led him to believe that the electrically charged particles should be deflected by the presence of an electric field. He was never able to prove this.

== Scandal ==
Varley had two sons and two daughters with his first wife, Ellen Cayley (née Rouse) (1837-1920), whom he married on 4 October 1855. The children's names were Hebe, Ada aka Nard Almayne (1856-1928), Cromwell Oliver (1857-1934), and Fleetwood E. Varley. Upon returning from a trip abroad, he discovered that his wife had gone off with Ion Perdicaris, a wealthy Greek-American. After the divorce was granted in 1873, she and the children settled with Perdicaris at Tangiers, Morocco. In 1904, Varley's elder son, also named Cromwell, was kidnapped along with Perdicaris by Mulai Ahmed er Raisuni, precipitating an international incident before both men were released unharmed.

On 11 January 1877, Varley married Heleanor Jessie Smith, daughter of Capt. Charles Smith of Forres, Scotland.

== Death ==
C.F. Varley died at Cromwell House, Bexleyheath, Kent, in 1883, aged 55, from undisclosed causes.

== Honours ==
- Member of the Institution of Civil Engineers, (1865);
- Fellow of the Royal Society, (1871);
- Founder member of the Society of Telegraph Engineers which became the Institution of Electrical Engineers.

== See also ==
- Electrostatic generator

== Bibliography ==
- Obituaries:
  - The Times, 5 September 1883
  - The Electrician, 11, pp. 397–98
  - "Electrical Review, 13, pp. 203–04
  - Engineering, 7 September 1883, p. 222

- Hunt, B.J. (2004) "Varley, Cromwell Fleetwood (1828–1883)", Oxford Dictionary of National Biography, Oxford University Press. Retrieved 23 July 2005 (subscription, Wikipedia Library access or UK public library membership required)
- Jeffery, J.V. (1997) "The Varley family: engineers and artists", Notes and Records of the Royal Society, 51, 263–79
- Lee, A.G (1932) "The Varley brothers: Cromwell Fleetwood Varley and Samuel Alfred Varley", Journal of the Institution of Electrical Engineers, 71, 958–64
- Munro, J. (1891). Heroes of the Telegraph. London: The Religious Tract Society.
- Noakes, R.J. (1999) "Telegraphy is an occult art: Cromwell Fleetwood Varley and the diffusion of electricity to the other world", British Journal for the History of Science, 32, pp. 421–59
