= John Varley (painter) =

British artist (1778–1842)

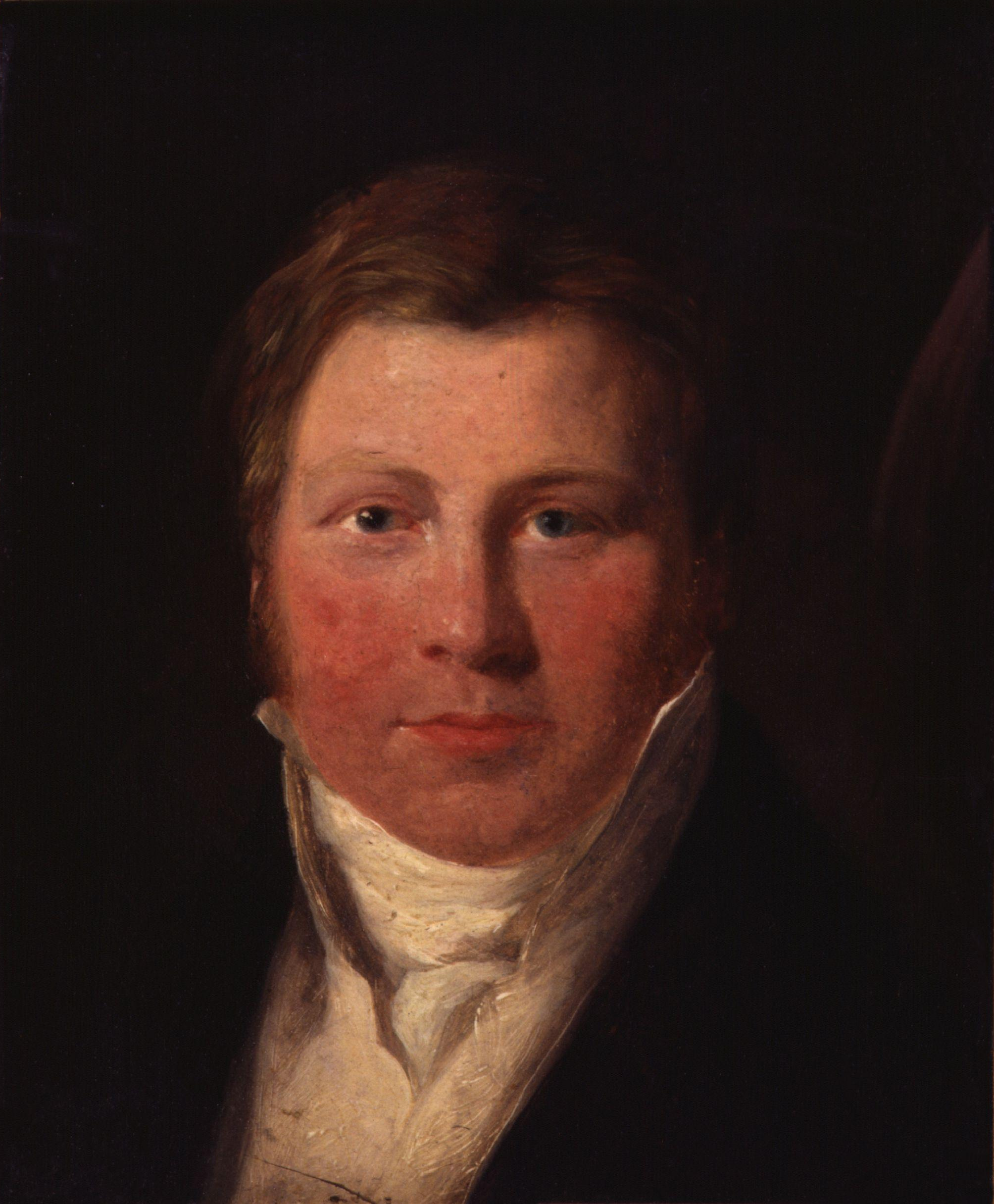
Portrait of John Varley by William Mulready, 1814

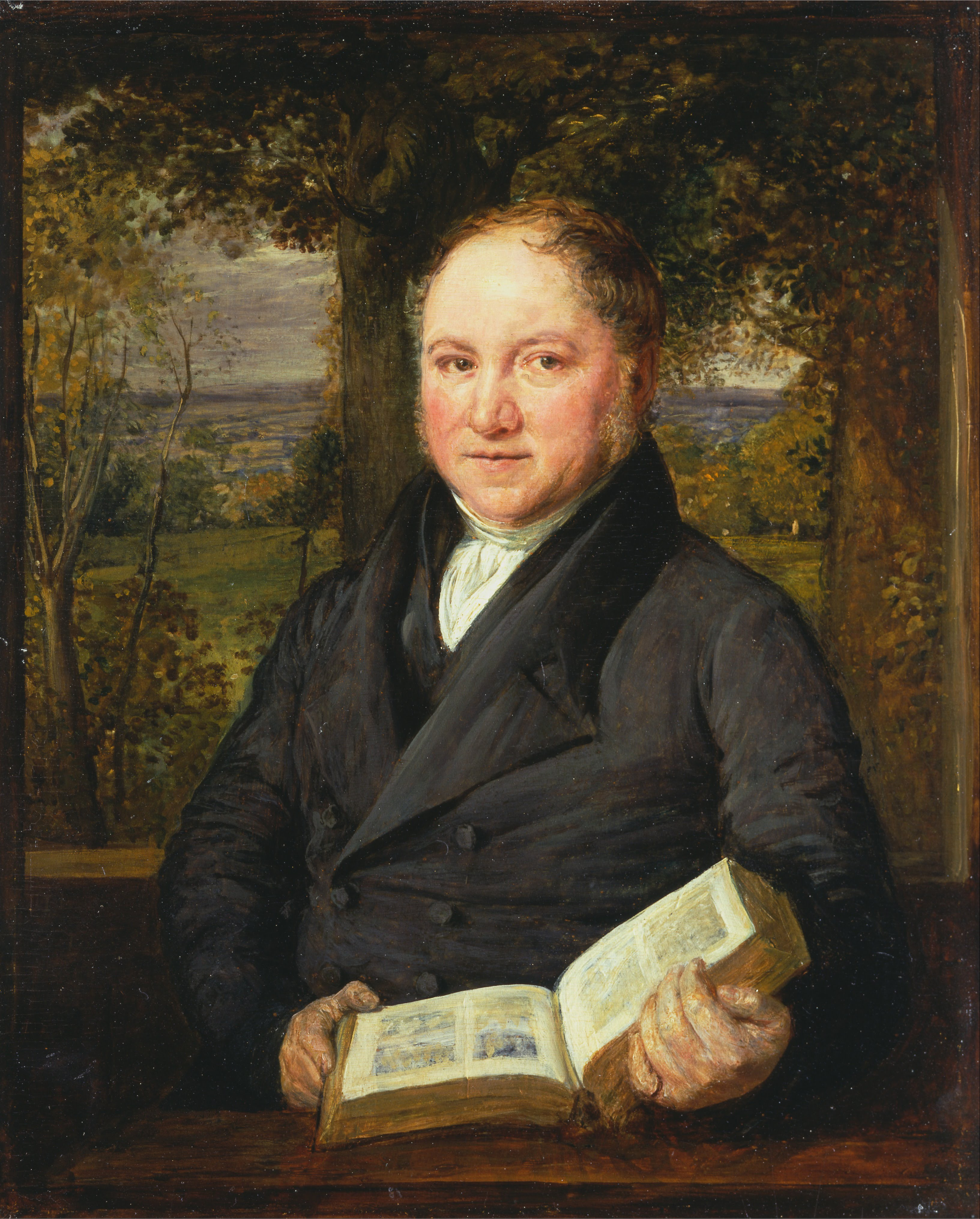
Portrait of John Varley by John Linnell, 1820

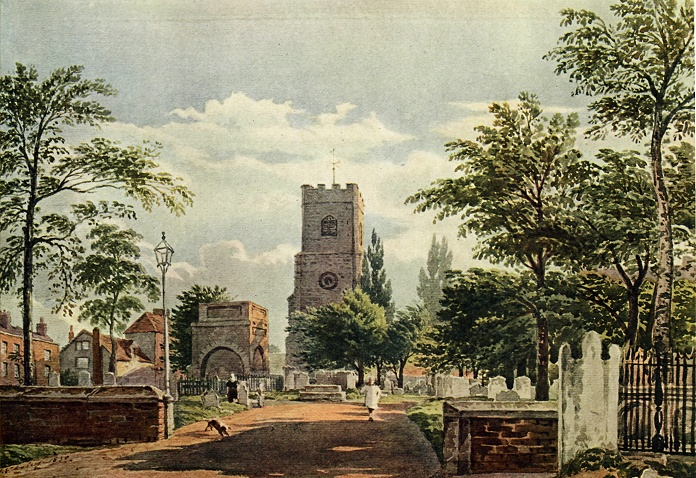
Hackney Church by John Varley

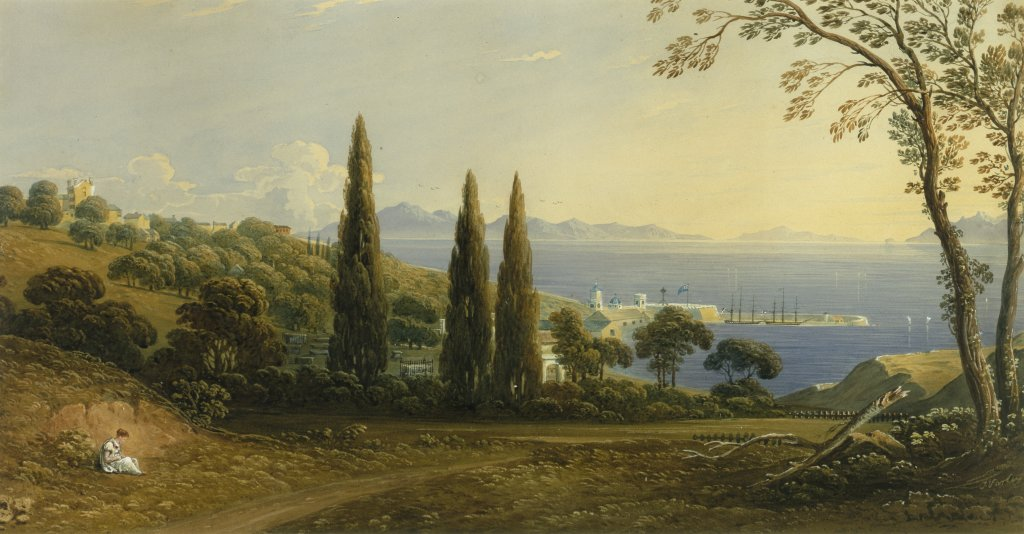
The Straits of Gibraltar

John Varley (17 August 1778, – 17 November 1842) was an English watercolour painter and astrologer, and a close friend of William Blake. They collaborated in 1819–1820 on the book Visionary Heads, written by Varley and illustrated by Blake. He was the elder brother of a family of artists: Cornelius Varley, William Fleetwood Varley, and Elizabeth, who married the painter William Mulready.

== Life and work ==
John Varley was born at the Old Blue Post Tavern, Hackney, on 17 August 1778. His father, Richard Varley, born at Epworth in Lincolnshire, had settled in London after the death of his first wife in Yorkshire. His mother was an alleged descendant of the regicide Oliver Cromwell through the marriage of his daughter, Bridget, and the Parliamentarian soldier and politician General Charles Fleetwood. Varley's parents discouraged his leanings towards art, and placed him under a silversmith. But on their death he was for a brief time employed by a portrait painter in Holborn and then, at the age of 15 or 16, he became a pupil of Joseph Charles Barrow (fl. 1789–1802) who had an evening drawing school twice a week at 12 Furnival's Inn Court, Holborn. It was Barrow who took Varley on a sketching tour to Peterborough from which he emerged as a professional painter. In 1798 he exhibited a highly regarded sketch of Peterborough Cathedral at the Royal Academy and became a regular exhibitor at the RA until the foundation of the Old Watercolour Society in 1805.

In 1799 he visited North Wales, and in its wild mountain scenery found the subjects best suited to his brush. He returned there in 1800, and again in 1802, and the impressions then received powerfully influenced the whole course of his art. He married Esther Gisborne on 14 November 1803 at St. James, Piccadilly, London, and became brother-in-law to Muzio Clementi in 1810 when the latter married Emma Gisborne.

Varley exhibited more than 700 works at the OWS of which he was one of the founders. He also became a highly successful drawing master, his pupils including Copley Fielding, David Cox, John Linnell and William Turner (artist) of Oxford. Despite his success, his growing family meant he was constantly in financial difficulties, "since he was both a hopeless businessman and by temperament something of a Micawber". (Mallalieu). Varley was particularly skilled at the laying of flat washes of watercolour which suited the placid, contemplative mood that he often sought to evoke.

Varley published A Treatise on the Principles of Landscape Drawing, 1816–21 and A Practical Treatise on the Art of Drawing in Perspective. He also wrote an astrological text (with illustrations) entitled A Treatise on Zodiacal Physiognomy in 1828.

He is buried at Kensal Green Cemetery.

== Works ==
- J Varley's List of Colours, published by John Varley, London 1818, 1pp.
- A Treatise on the Principles of Landscape Drawing...
- A Practical Tratise on the Art of Drawing in Perspective: adapted for the study of those who draw from nature; by which the usual errors can be avoided (printed for Sherwood, Gilbert, and Piper,...and R. Ackermann, ..., London ?1815/1820?).
- A Treatise on Zodiacal Physiognomy, illustrated by engravings of heads and features, and accompanied by tables of the time of rising of the twelve signs of the zodiac; and containing also new and astrological explanations of some remarkable portions of ancient mythological history (published for the author, 10½, Great Tichfield Street, London 1828; sold by Longman) IV, 60pp.: 6 Plates, (8vo), 25 cm; plates engraved by J. Linnell.

According to the Encyclopædia Britannica Eleventh Edition, "Varley's landscapes are graceful and solemn in feeling, and simple and broad in treatment, being worked with a full brush and pure fresh transparent tints, usually without any admixture of body-colour. Though his works are rather mannered and conventional, they are well considered and excellent in composition. Some of his earlier water-colours, including his "Views of the Thames," were painted upon the spot, and possess greater individuality than his later productions, which are mainly compositions of mountain and lake scenery, produced without direct reference to nature."

== See also ==
- List of British artists
