= Graphic telescope =

Type of camera lucida

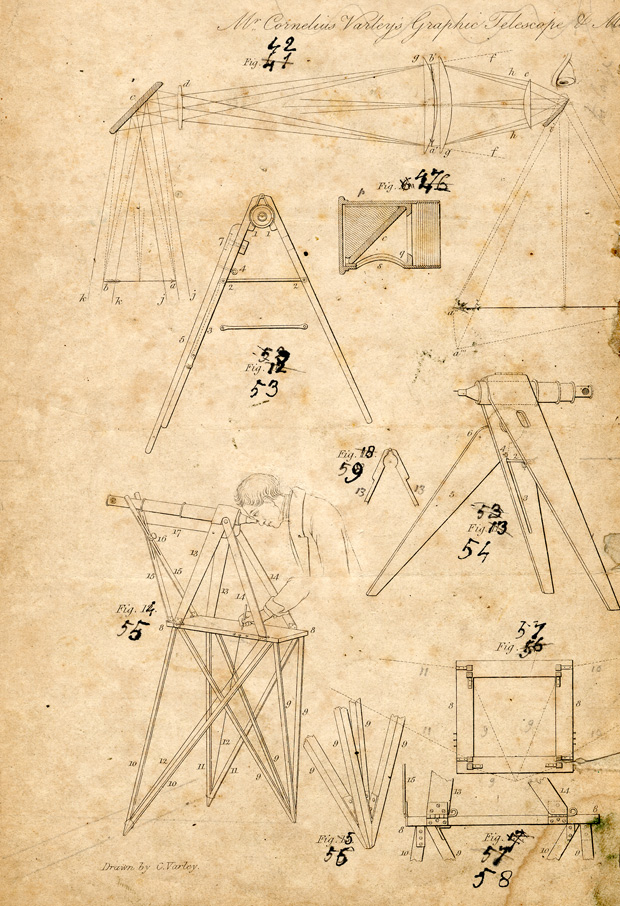
Some of Cornelius Varley's drawings of his invention

The graphic telescope is a type of camera lucida that has the power of a telescope. It was invented by Cornelius Varley in 1809. It can be used to draw broad landscapes.

Graphic telescopes allow the size of the projected image to be adjusted. They can be used separately, or with a portable table to reduce vibrations. They may also be mounted in a vehicle.

== See also ==
- List of telescope types
