= Camera lucida =

Optical drawing aid

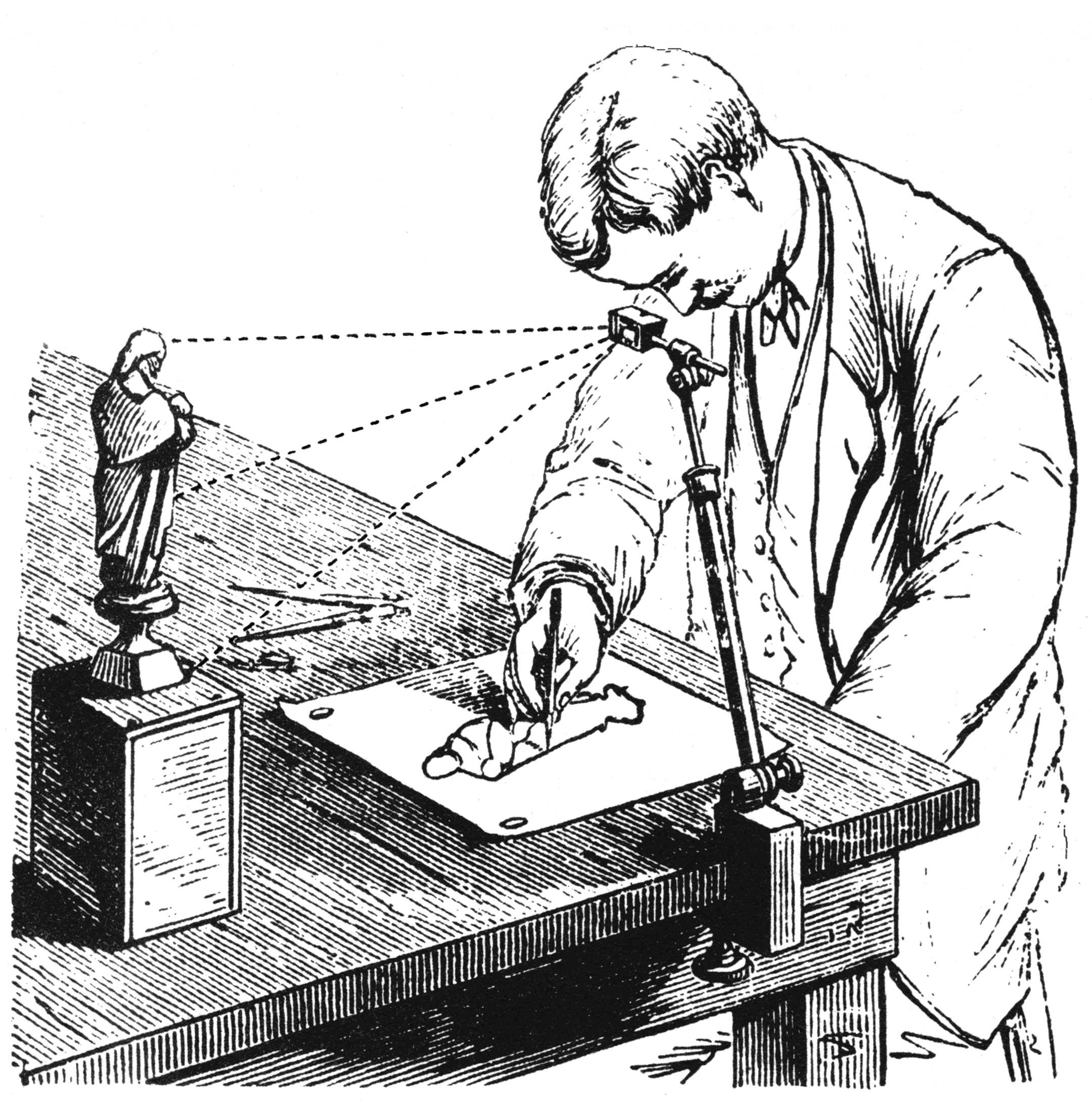
Camera lucida in use

A camera lucida is an optical device used as a drawing aid by artists and microscopists. By looking through the prism in its standard, a user sees an optical superimposition of the subject positioned in front of the device over the surface below. This allows the artist to duplicate key points of the scene on the drawing surface, thus aiding in the accurate rendering of perspective.

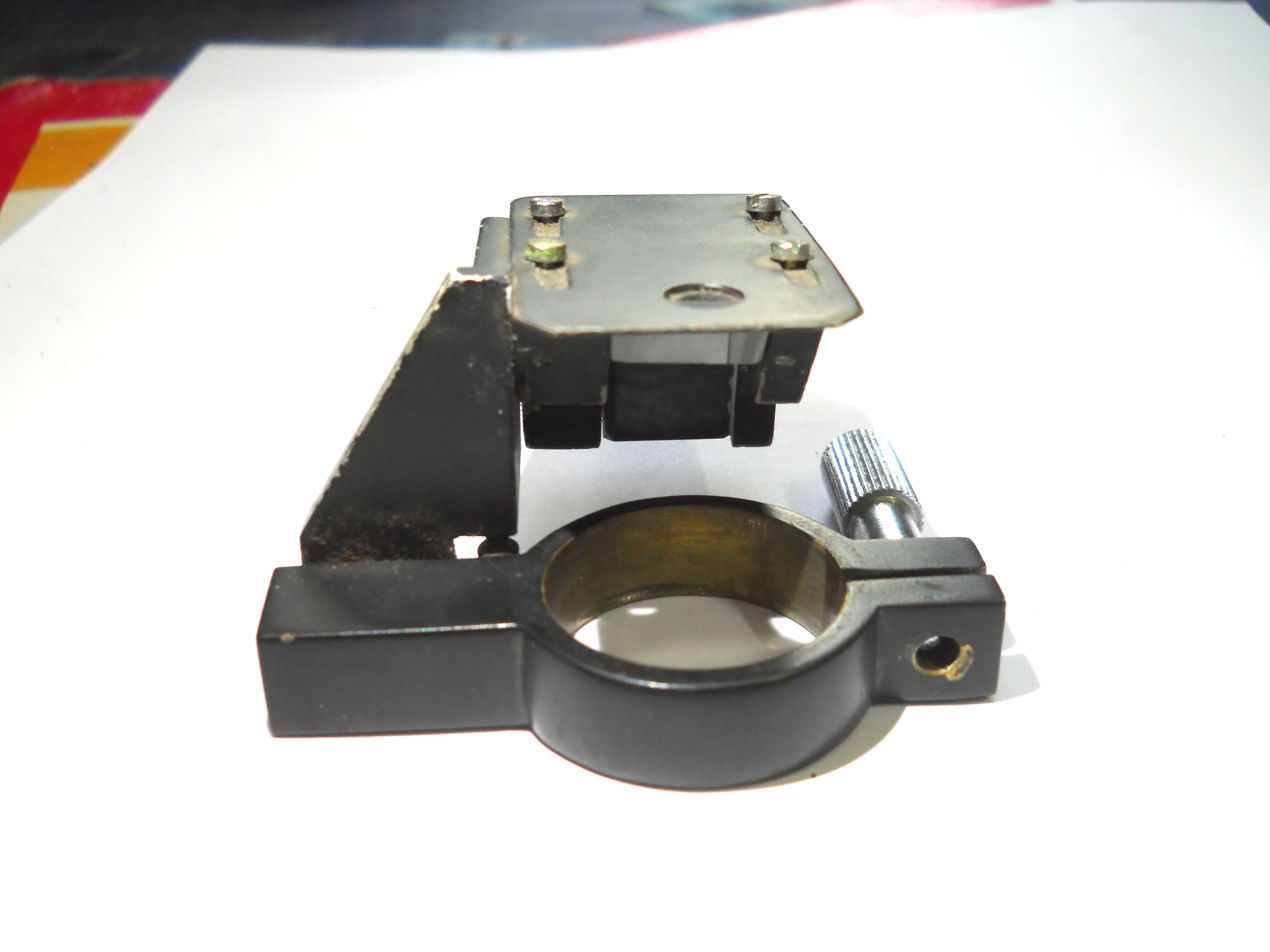
Camera Lucida or Drawing Prism for Biological Microscopic Drawing

A camera lucida is somewhat similar in mechanism to a periscope. However it completes two total internal reflections, generally within a single glass parallellepiped or rhomboid that works as a double prism.

This causes a shifted (parallax-like) image of the pencil tip that overlaps with the microscopic field of vision. Then the microscopist traces the contours of the objects seen in the microscopic field on the piece of paper using the pencil.

== History ==
The camera lucida was patented in 1806 by the English chemist William Hyde Wollaston.

The basic optics were described 200 years earlier by the German astronomer Johannes Kepler in his Dioptrice (1611), but there is no evidence he constructed a working camera lucida. There is also evidence to suggest that the Elizabethan spy Arthur Gregory's 1596 "perspective box" operated on at least highly similar principles to the later camera lucida, but the secretive nature of his work and fear of rivals copying his methods led to his invention becoming lost. By the 19th century, Kepler's description had similarly fallen into oblivion, so Wollaston's claim to have invented the device was never challenged. The term "camera lucida" (Latin 'well-lit room' as opposed to camera obscura 'dark room') is Wollaston's.

While on honeymoon in Italy in 1833, the photographic pioneer William Fox Talbot used a camera lucida as a sketching aid. He later wrote that it was a disappointment with his resulting efforts which encouraged him to seek a means to "cause these natural images to imprint themselves durably".

In 2001, artist David Hockney's book Secret Knowledge: Rediscovering the Lost Techniques of the Old Masters was met with controversy. His argument, known as the Hockney-Falco thesis, is that the notable transition in style for greater precision and visual realism that occurred around the decade of the 1420s is attributable to the artists' discovery of the capability of optical projection devices, specifically an arrangement using a concave mirror to project real images. Hockney was inspired after seeing drawings by Ingres, which he came to suspect were made with the aid of a camera lucida.

The camera lucida is still available today through art-supply channels but is not well known or widely used. It has enjoyed a resurgence as of 2017 through a number of Kickstarter campaigns.

== Description ==
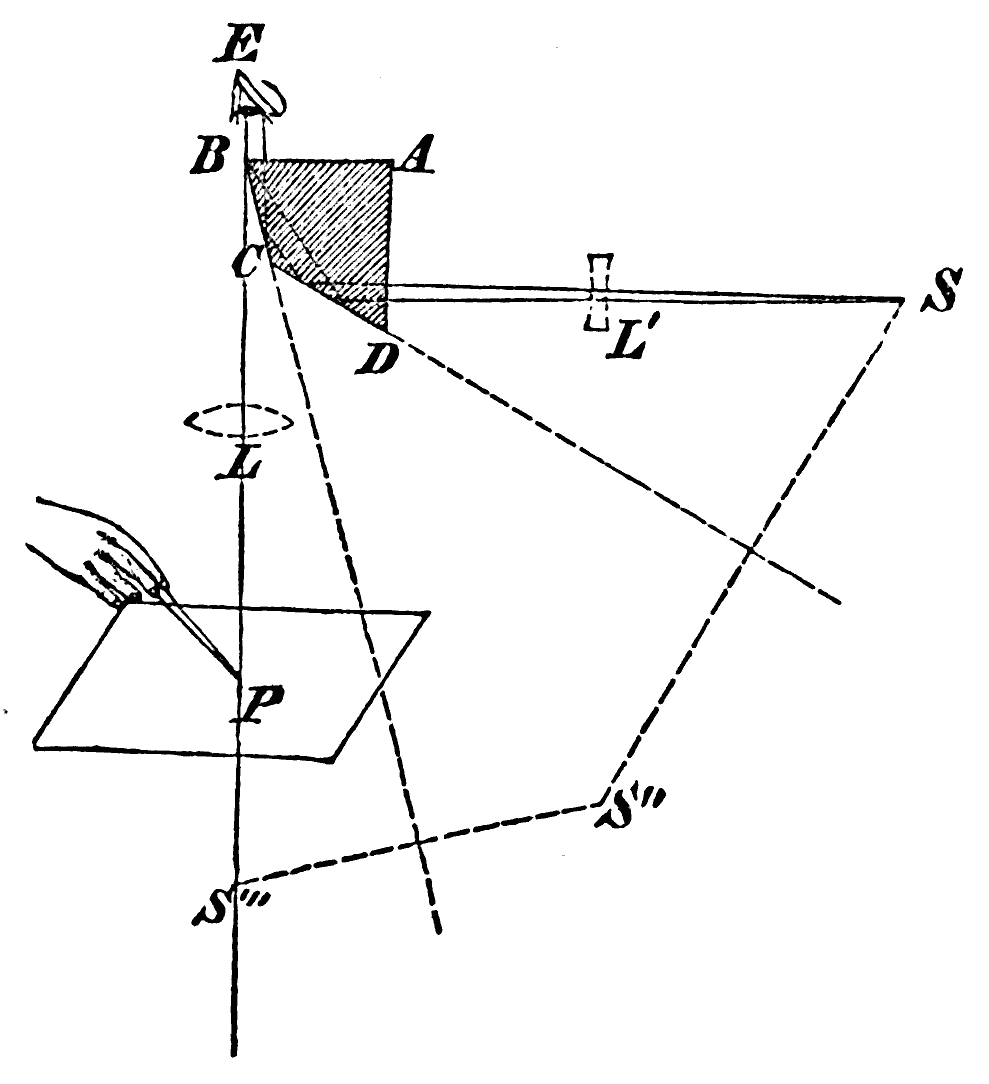
Optics of Wollaston's camera lucida

The name "camera lucida" (Latin for 'light chamber') is intended to recall the much older drawing aid, the camera obscura (Latin for 'dark chamber'). There is no optical similarity between the devices. The camera lucida is a lightweight, portable device that does not require special lighting conditions. No image is projected by the camera lucida.

In the simplest form of camera lucida, the artist looks down at the drawing surface through a glass pane or half-silvered mirror tilted at 45 degrees. This superimposes a direct view of the drawing surface beneath, and a reflected view of a scene horizontally in front of the artist. This design produces an inverted image which is right-left reversed when turned the right way up. Also, light is lost in the imperfect reflection.

Wollaston's design used a prism with four optical faces to produce two successive reflections (see illustration), thus producing an image that is not inverted or reversed. Angles ABC and ADC are 67.5° and BCD is 135°. Hence, the reflections occur through total internal reflection, so very little light is lost. It is not possible to see straight through the prism, so it is necessary to look at the very edge to see the paper.

The instrument often came with an assortment of weak negative lenses, to create a virtual image of the scene at several distances. If the right lens is inserted, so that the chosen distance roughly equals the distance of the drawing surface, both images can be viewed in good focus simultaneously.

If white paper is used with the camera lucida, the superimposition of the paper with the scene tends to wash out the scene, making it difficult to view. When working with a camera lucida, it is often beneficial to use toned or grey paper. Some historical designs included shaded filters to help balance lighting.

== Microscopy ==
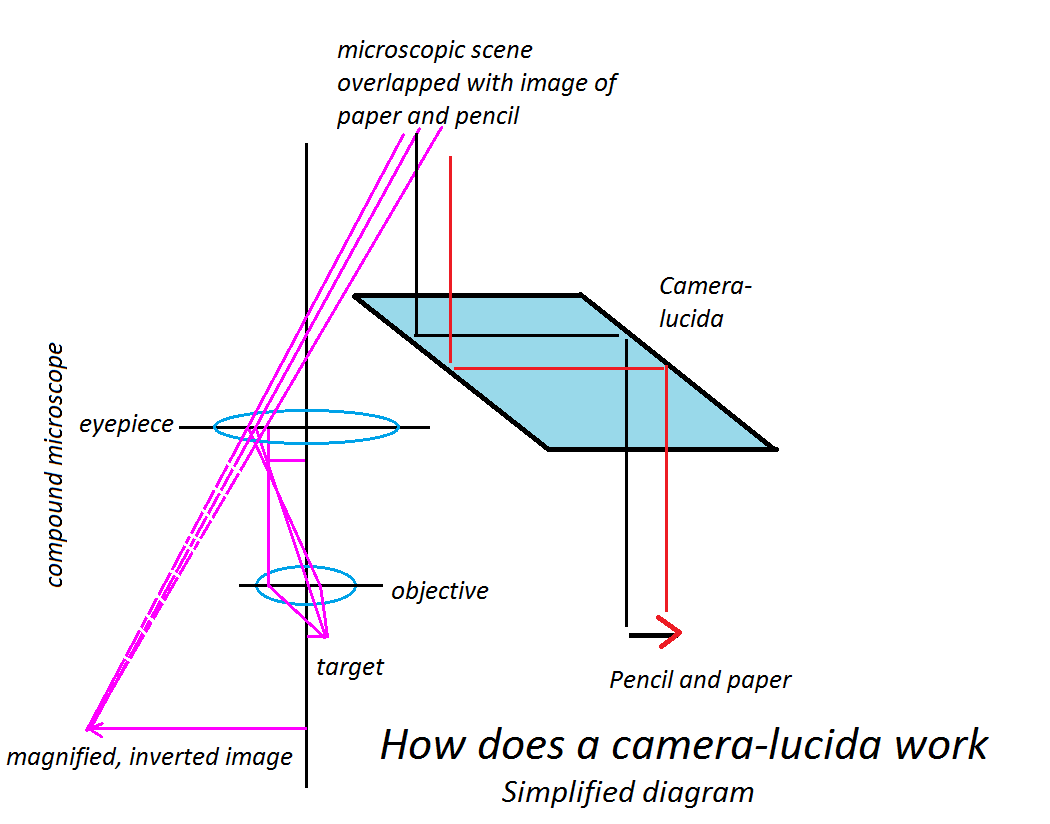
Camera lucida mechanism in Biological microscopy

19th-century microscope fitted with a camera lucida

As recently as the 1980s, the camera lucida was still a standard tool of microscopists. It is still a key tool in the field of palaeontology. Until very recently, photomicrographs were expensive to reproduce. Furthermore, in many cases, a clear illustration of the structure that the microscopist wished to document was much easier to produce by drawing than by micrography. Thus, most routine histological and microanatomical illustrations in textbooks and research papers were camera lucida drawings rather than photomicrographs. The camera lucida is still used as the most common method among neurobiologists for drawing brain structures, although it is recognised to have limitations. "For decades in cellular neuroscience, camera lucida hand drawings have constituted essential illustrations. (...) The limitations of camera lucida can be avoided by the procedure of digital reconstruction". Of particular concern is distortion, and new digital methods are being introduced which can limit or remove this, "computerized techniques result in far fewer errors in data transcription and analysis than the camera lucida procedure". It is also regularly used in biological taxonomy.

== Gallery ==
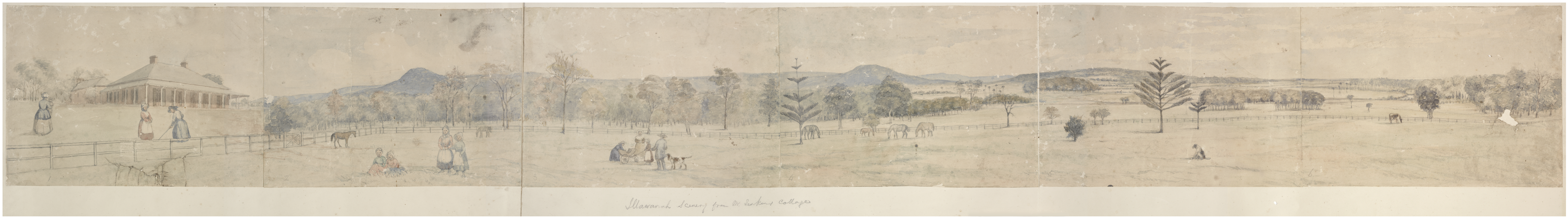
Scenery from Mr Jenkins' cottage, Illawarra, ca. 1850, by John Rae, watercolour drawing created using a camera lucida, State Library of New South Wales, DL PXX 74 no.16

== See also ==
- Camera obscura
- Claude glass, or black mirror
- Graphic telescope
- Ocular micrometer
- Pepper's ghost
- Total internal reflection
