= Moroccan nationalism =

Nationalism in Morocco

Flag of Morocco

Moroccan nationalism refers to the nationalism of the Moroccans and Moroccan culture. Historically, it has been influenced by the conflicts between the Saadi Sultanate and European countries along with the Ottoman Empire, French and Spanish colonialism in Morocco, Salafism and Arab–Islamic nationalism.

The first manifestation of a Moroccan national identity was in the 16th century under the Saadi Sultanate. Moroccan nationalism first developed in the 1920s among urban intellectuals especially in Salafist circles in cities like Rabat, Fes and Tangier under European colonial rule. However, after the Berber Dahir, it began to encompass the masses and helped to organise the nationalist movement. In the 1930s, early nationalist organisations like the Moroccan Action Committee were formed to protest the Berber Dahir and seek reform. These nationalist figures eventually published the Moroccan Plan of Reforms.

After a split in the nationalist movement and the exile of several nationalist leaders, nationalists shifted their goal from reform of the protectorate in line with the Treaty of Fes to complete independence with Mohammed V as king. Several parties were formed at this time with the biggest being the Istiqlal Party. The Istiqlal published an Independence Manifesto laying out the nationalist movement's demands for independence. Around this time, Sultan Mohammed V became increasingly involved with the nationalist movement publicly aligning himself with the nationalists with the Tangier Speech. This eventually led to his deposition and exile by the French and grand caid and Pasha of Marrakesh Thami El Glaoui. The exile of Mohammed led to the rise of urban violence and rural violence with the establishment of the Moroccan Liberation Army. Thousands of attacks occurred in major cities like bombings and assassinations. This eventually led to Mohammed V returning and the French and Spanish leaving Morocco.

In 1956, the Istiqlal published a map depicting Greater Morocco, which covered the land they argued belonged to Morocco historically before colonialism. This irridentist claim later would influence the foreign policy in Morocco and play a role in their claim over the Western Sahara. The 1975 Green March led to Spain exiting the Western Sahara but it brought Morocco into conflict with the Polisario Front due to their competing nationalist claims.

== Early manifestations ==
=== Formation of a national identity ===
Some historians attribute the formation of a distinct Moroccan national identity to the start of the 16th century. For example, the Moroccan historian Mohamed Hajji, attributing the beginning of Moroccan nationalism to the 16th to 17th centuries, argues that Moroccan resistance against Spanish and Portuguese incursions were the earliest examples of a Moroccan national consciousness. He backs this up further by pointing out how Morocco also resisted Ottoman expansion into Morocco despite being coreligionists showing that Moroccan self-conception also included a national consciousness superseding religious affiliations. The Saadis, who ruled at this time, are credited with this birth of a Moroccan national consciousness. The historian Dahiru Yahaya argued that the most lasting impact of the Saadis was the development of this national consciousness in Morocco.

=== Hafidiya ===
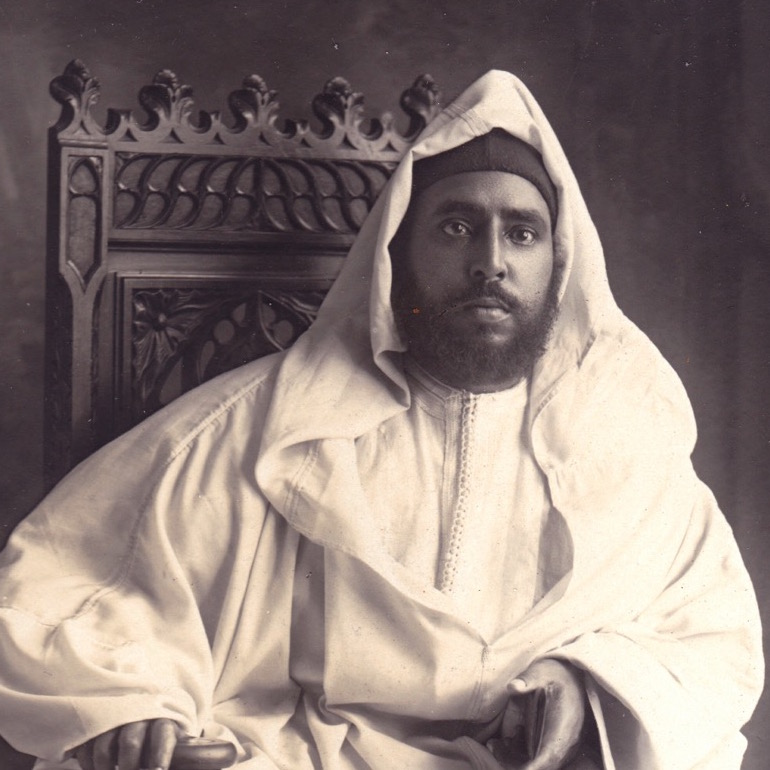
Abd al-Hafid of Morocco led the Hafidiya, a rebellion against his brother Abd al-Aziz due to growing European influence.

The Hafidiya has been described by the cultural historian Edward Berenson as part "anticolonial struggle" and part "national rebellion". Tribes involved in the rebellion like the Rahamna sometimes went against their tribal interests and security to support the rebellion and national defence because they saw themselves as Moroccans.

=== Nationalism in the protectorate before the Dahir ===
Throughout the 1920s, a number of scholars established the "free schools" (Arabic: مدارس حرة, romanized: madaris ḥurra) which combined reformist Islam and Western science based on the ideas of the Salafi movement and were independent of government control. The first free school was established in 1919. These free schools taught Classical Arabic and Islamic thought. The purpose of these was to cultivate a sense of national identity among urban youth and laid a cultural foundation for nationalism by "instilling national spirit—feeling of patriotism and a sense of Moroccan nationhood—in the students." By 1937, they provided primary education for 5000 students.

The prominent Moroccan nationalist figure Allal al-Fassi describing the development of early nationalism in Morocco and the influence of the Salafi movement says:

The Moroccan youths found in the Salafiyah movement a field for action and a training center for disciplined service and sacrifice. They formed centers in Fez, Rabat, and Tetuan for participation in public affairs. Opposition to the sheikhs who had benefited from the protectorate regime was foremost in their program of action. Small study groups sprang up for investigating outstanding public issues and enlightening public opinion in regard to them. The Karaouiyine University at Fez was a meeting place for students from all parts of the land, and we considered it our duty to instill into them the spirit of the Salafiyah and the nationalist creeds.

In the French zone, Moroccan nationalism developed in two different major cities: Fes and Rabat. In Fes, the nationalist groups that emerged were more religious, conservative and traditional in outlook while in Rabat, the groups had a more European outlook and ideology with many of their leaders having a modern education in France or Europe. However, this did not prevent the groups from working with another. For example, taking inspiration from nationalist movements in Egypt, Turkey and other parts of the Middle East and India, young nationalists started to form groups notably one in Rabat and one in Fes. The Rabat group, the Supporters of Truth, and the Fes group, the Students Union, joined to form to Moroccan League. This would later lead to the formation of the Moroccan Action Committee.

== Moroccan Nationalist Movement ==
=== Emergence in response to the Berber Dahir ===
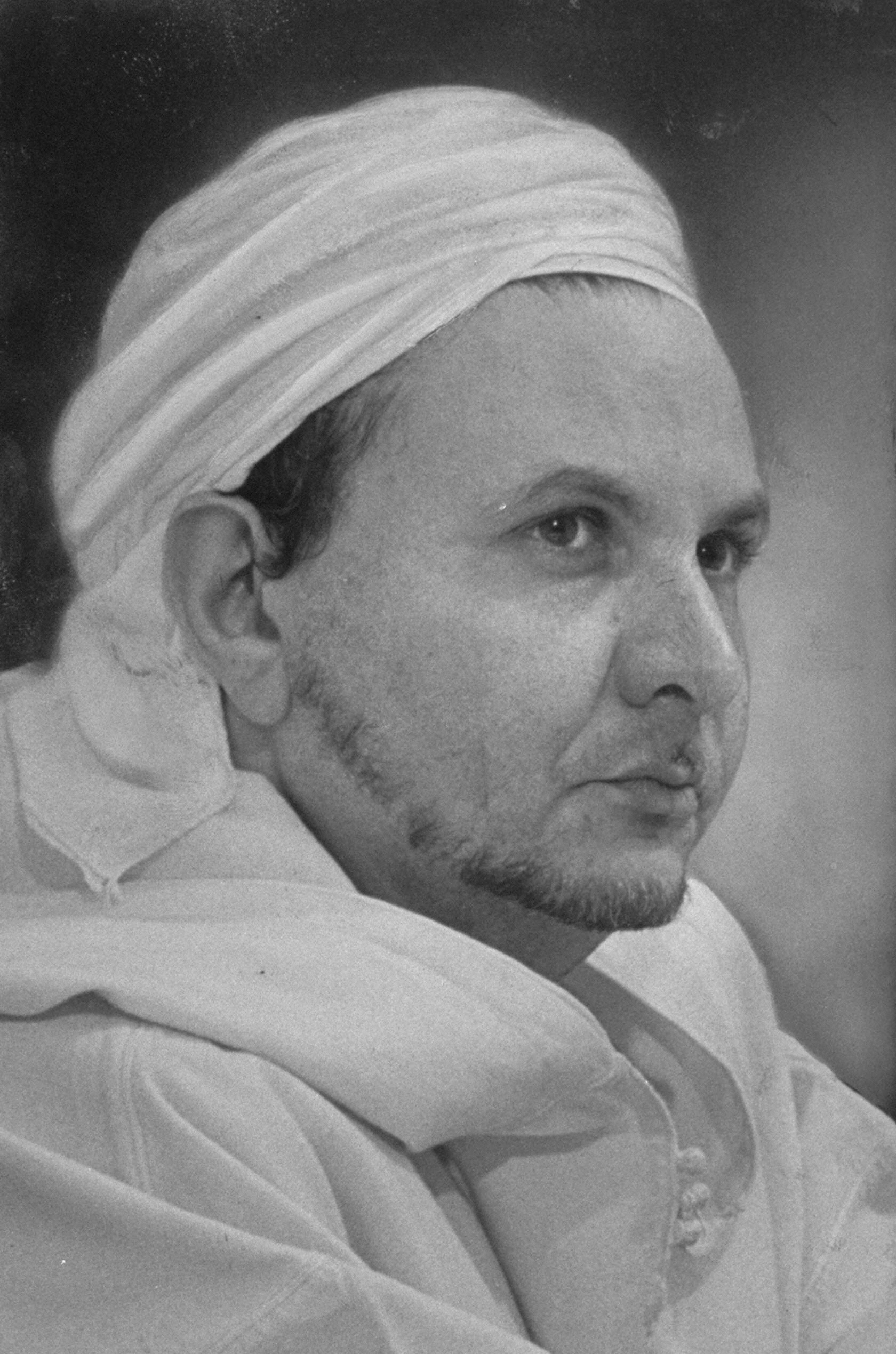
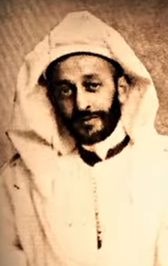
Both Allal al-Fassi and Abdesalam Bennuna have been described as the "Father of Moroccan Nationalism".

The Berber Dahir proved to be a "foundational event in the unfolding story of Moroccan nationalism" according to the historian Susan Gilson Miller. Before 1930, the Moroccan nationalist movement lacked unity, a formal organisation structure and a clear programme. The Berber Dahir attempted to place Berber tribal areas under customary law officially rather than Sharia. This Dahir also made it so that criminal cases would by judged under French law rather under Islamic law. This was seen by Arab elites as an attempt to divide Arabs and Berbers and an attack on Islam. There were also rumours that it was an attempt to convert the Berbers into Catholicism. According to some, the Berber Dahir allowed Moroccan nationalism to evolve from a small cadre of intellectuals to a popular political movement. It also shifted the emphasis of national activity from cultural to political.

In response to the Dahir, nationalists like Ahmed Balafrej and Allal al-Fassi began to coordinate. Nationalist leaders like Allal al-Fassi, Ahmed Balafrej, Omar Benabdeljalil and Mohammed Hassan Ouazzani established a network of connections with nationalists in Algeria and Tunisia, many of whom belong to the North African Muslim Students Association founded in 1927. The protests that emerged in response to the Dahir including the recitation of latif prayers, a prayer usually recited in times of crisis. The scholar Emily Benichou Gottreich says "the latif prayer marks the first mass manifestation of modern nationalism in Morocco." The words of the latif prayer were modified for the context of the protest with the additional of a special ending:

Oh God, the Benevolent, we ask of You benevolence in whatever fate brings, and do not separate us from our brothers, the Berbers.

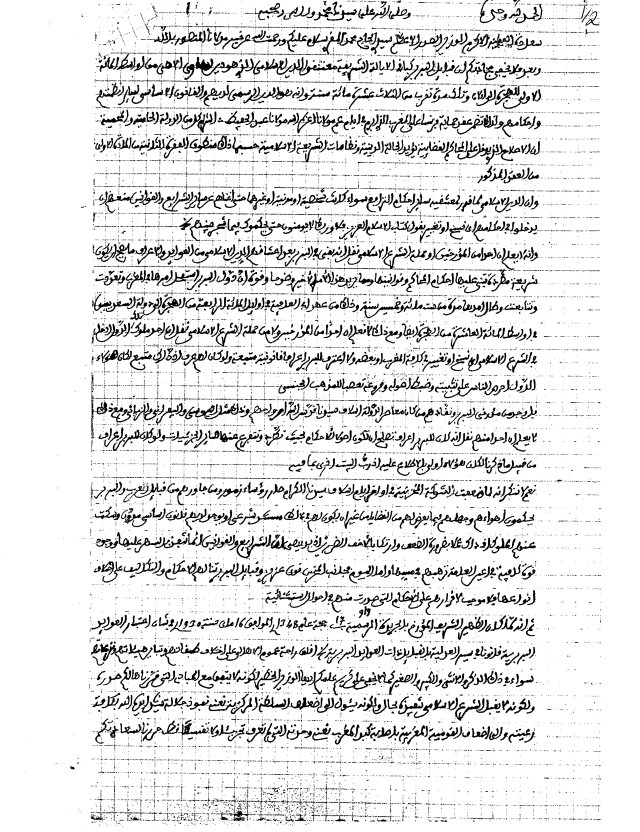
Petition from Salé against the Berber Dahir

In August 1930, activists from Salé, Rabat, Tetouan and Fes formed the Zawiya a steering committee composed of the most important nationalist leaders. There was also a larger group called the Taifa or the "Outer Circle". Membership in the Taifa required an oath of allegiance and the payment of dues. The oath involved a prospective member putting his finger on the Qad-sami chapter of the Quran and saying "I swear by God and the Qur'an that I will follow the orders of the Wataniyin." This movement adopted the nomenclature, structure and religious undertones of Sufi orders for their own organisation. In rural areas especially, they adopted a master-discipline relationship like Sufi orders and competed with Sufi orders like the Qadiriyya and Tijaniyya. After the movement split in 1936, those that followed Allal al-Fassi were referred to often as the Allaliyin, with al-Fassi referred to as Shaykh Allal or Hajj Allal. The political scientist John Waterbury argues that "Nationalism [in Morocco] made no real and important progress until it took the form of a religious brotherhood, the 'nationalist zawiya,' and until ʿAllal al-Fassi became Shaykh ʿAllal." Another organisation that formed from the protest movement against the Dahir was the Moroccan Action Committee (French: Comité d'Action Marocaine; CAM) also known as the National Action Bloc (Arabic: كتلة العمل الوطني, romanized: Kutlat al-ʿAmal al-Waṭanī; or the Kutla). The Kutla reached 6500 members before it disbanded in 1937. Its president was Allal al-Fassi and its secretary was Mohammed Hassan Ouazzani.

The Kutla published the Plan of Reforms (French: Plan de Réformes marocaines) in 1934 in both Arabic and French. The demands of the reform plan included the abolition of the Berber Dahir, unification of legal systems under Maliki law, expansion of the education system open to Moroccans, the forming of municipal councils, the promotion of Moroccans into positions of power and making Arabic an official language. The reform plan did not outright call for independence but sought reform and the restoring of confidence in the aims of the 1912 Treaty of Fes. The ten signatories of the reform plan were all from the French protectorate and included nationalists like Mohammed Hassan Ouazzani and Allal al-Fassi. Allal al-Fassi discussing the reform plan says:

The reform program was an ingenious stratagem to reconcile the existing treaties with the interests of the country, in the economic section, for example, the Kutla advocated the open-door policy and free trade, in accordance with the resolutions of the Algeciras Conference. This platform was designed to appeal to the support of the left-wing parties in France and to the signatories of the Algeciras international conference; at the same time, it was agreeable to the best interests of Morocco under the circumstances.

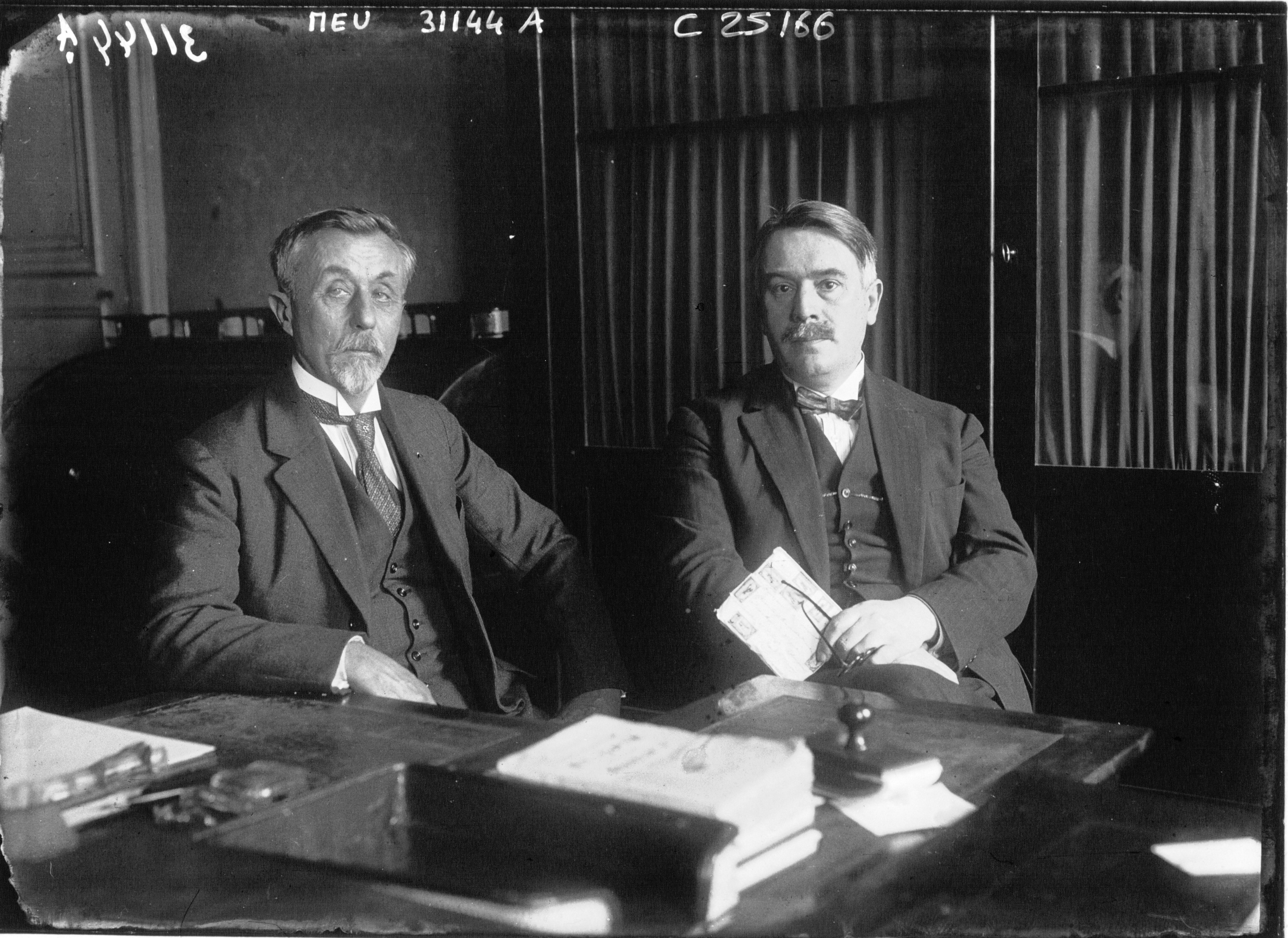
Henri Ponsot (right) c. 1927

On 1 December, Omar Benabdeljalil, Mohamed Lyazidi and Mohammed Hassan Ouazzani presented the plan to the French foreign minister, Pierre Laval. In Rabat, Mohamed Ghazi presented a copy to the Sultan and Lyazidi, Mohammed Diouri and Allal al-Fassi took it the Resident-General. While the plan had support from some French politicians like Gaston Bergery, César Campinchi and Georges Monnet, the plan was rejected by the French administration and the French Resident-General Henri Ponsot dismissively described it as a "good doctoral thesis" without making any serious comment on its ideas. This dismissive attitude held by the French did not change throughout the decade. This rejection sparked street demonstrations in cities like Fes and Kenitra in November 1936 and 1937.

By 1937, the nationalist movement started to split. The Kutla was also outlawed by the French protectorate on 18 March 1937. Traditionally, the split has been characterised as one between "traditionalists" and "Westernists" but this split was likely more to do with personality differences and disagreements over the structure of leadership. The Kutla split into the National Party (Ḥizb al-Waṭanī) which al-Fassi co-led and the Popular Movement (Ḥaraka Shaʿbiyya) later the Party of Democracy and Independence (Ḥizb al-Shūrā wa-l-Istiqlāl) which was led by al-Fassi's former ally Mohamed Hassan Ouazzani. The first led by al-Fassi was a populist party while Ouazzani's party was more open to contacts with the French left. The demands of the National Party were only reformist, not revolutionary and while Ouazzani's party claimed to be more radical, it was not very different from al-Fassi's. Al-Fassi supported a theocratic government and he saw Ouazzani as an upstart from a less illustrious family than him. He believed in achieving his goals by depending on a mass protest and achieving it by persuasion or even by violence. Ouazzani who received a modern education in France advocated for parliamentary democracy and he believed he could realise his goals through diplomacy by a reasonable presentation of the Moroccan position in the press to influence French and world opinion.

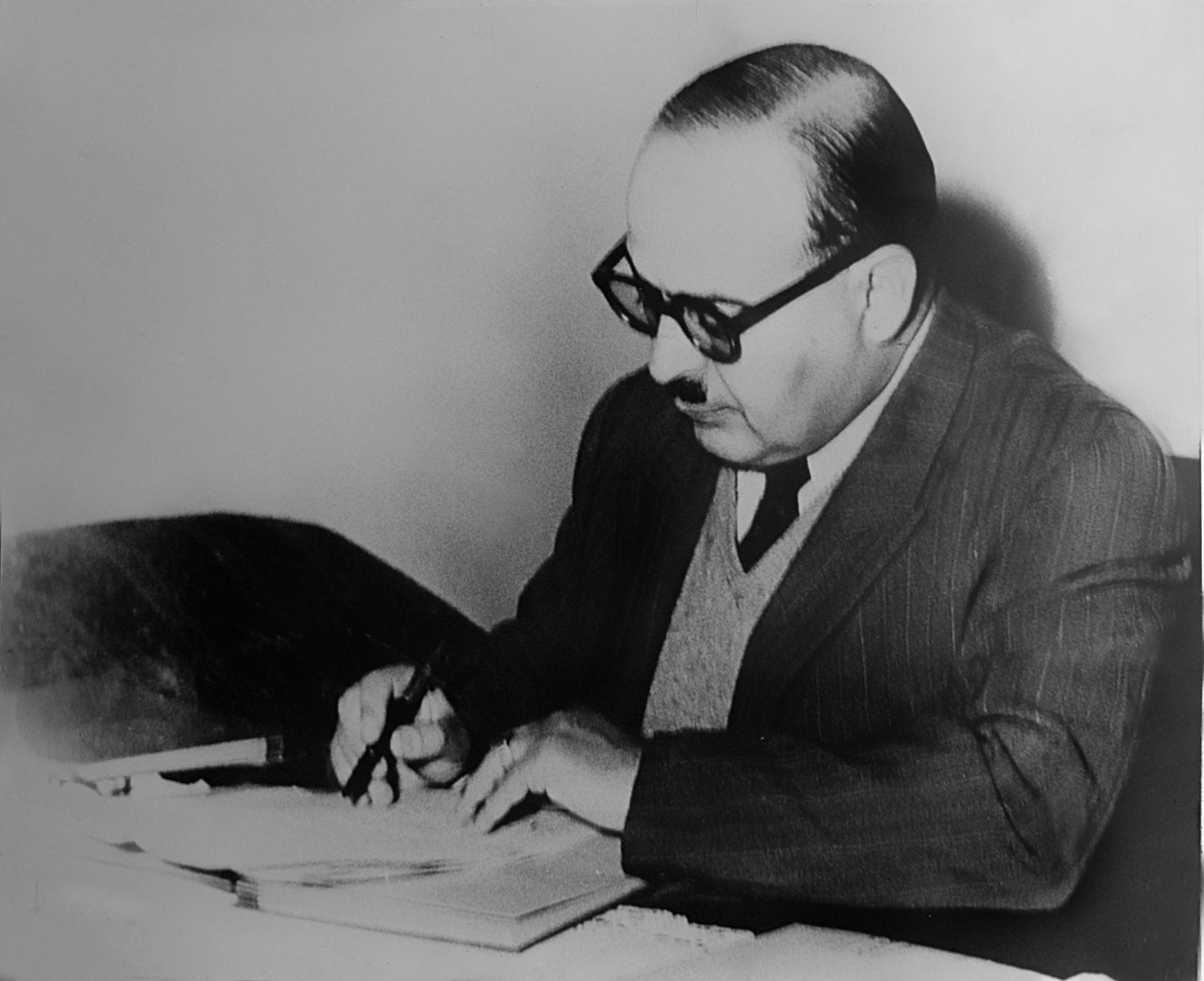
Mohammed Hassan Ouazzani

On 12 April 1937, an arrêté viziriel was proposed to divert the water supply of Meknes to European farms. This allegedly deprived Meknes of its water supply and nationalist figures claimed that this was part of a scheme by the Protectorate to enrich European farmers and deprive the natives. A commission was made to inspect the claims and it included the Pasha of Meknes and head of the city's municipal services but it backfired. Demonstrators gathered outside the offices of the commission chanting "They've taken our water— not a drop of it to the settlers." In response to the decree, two thousand Muslim notables representing the population of Meknes addressed petitions to the sultan and resident-general calling for justice and equality. Mohamed Hassan Ouazzani wrote in his newspaper L'Action du Peuple "We and all the Moroccan population stand with Meknes to defend its fundamental rights over the waters of Bou Fakran." After protests on 1 September 1937, five men were arrested: Muhammad Barrada, Driss Manumi, Ahmad ibn Shaqrun, Muhammad Ben Azzou, and Madani Slawi. Popular riots emerged in cities like Casablanca, Meknes, Rabat, Fes, Oujda and Marrakesh from October 25 to October 27 after nationalists called for a response and detailed the events in the press. This led to French troops occupying the Fes madina and arresting and exiling the nationalist leadership. In total, over 400 people were arrested. Some of the nationalist leaders exiled included Allal al-Fassi who was exiled to Gabon and Ouazzani who was exiled to the Sahara.

=== Nationalism in the Spanish zone ===
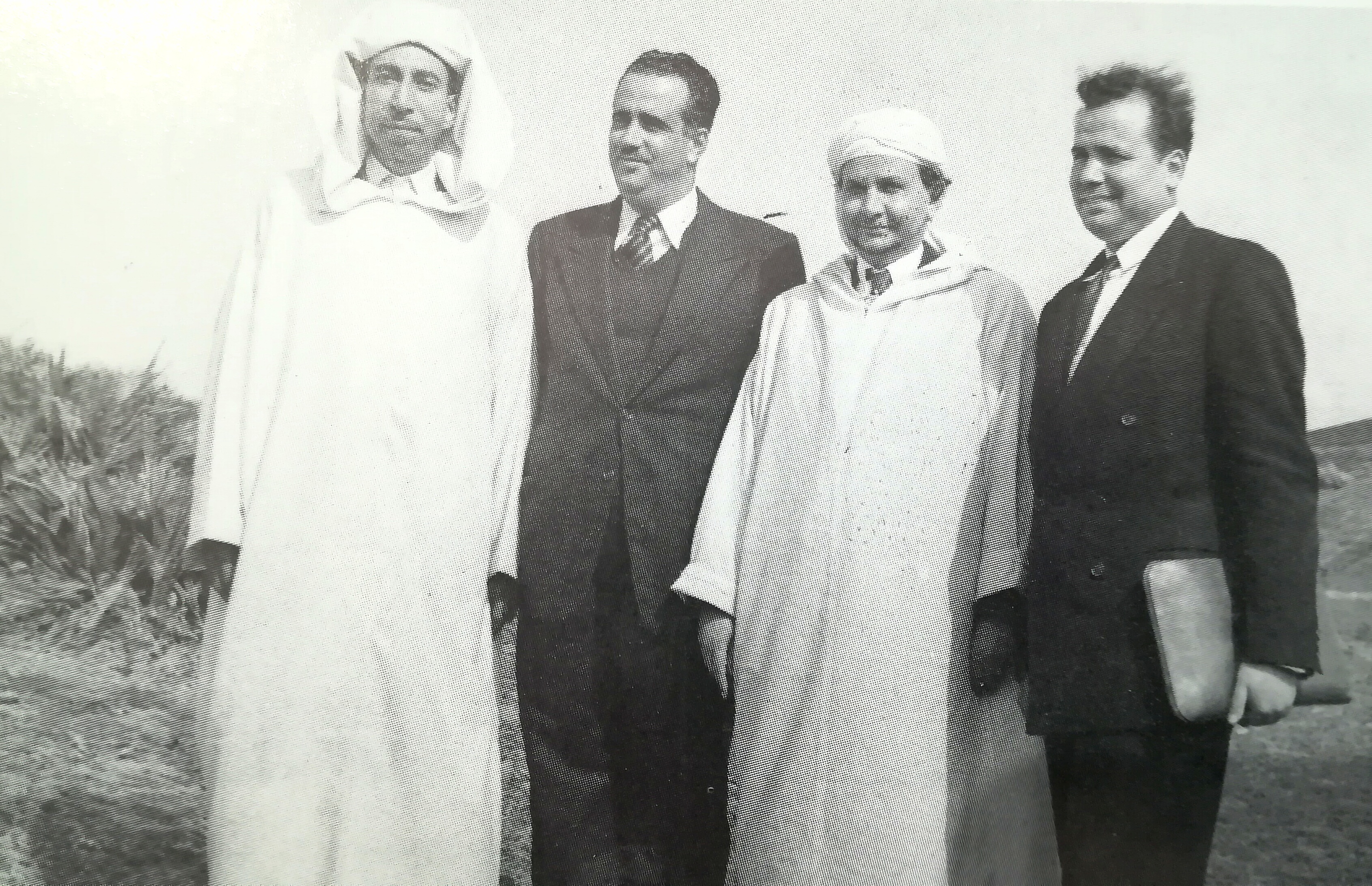
Makki Nasiri, Abdelkhalek Torres, Allal al-Fassi and Ahmed Bensouda (from left to right) c. 1951

In 1930, a group of nationalists established a nationalist organisation in Tetouan consisting of nationalists like Abdelkhalek Torres, Muhammad Dawud, Abdelslam Benjelloun and Mehdi Bennouna. The Spanish authorities depicted themselves as a defender of the cultural and religious unity of Moroccans under the banner of an Arab-Islamic identity in Morocco. There was a push to Arabize Spanish schools in the Spanish zone. Their attitudes was reflected in their usage of "Hispano-Arab" rather than "Hispano-Moorish". The newspapers of these Moroccan nationalists were allowed to flourish by the Spanish authorities because they critiqued Spain's rival, France, without critiquing Spain.

In the Spanish zone, there were also divisions within the movement. The Spanish Civil War had a very big influence in the way the parties were characterised there. While the Moroccan nationalists in the Spanish zone initially supported the Spanish republicans in exchange for independence of the Rif, their demands were refused. Abdelkhalek Torres led the National Reform Party and he had contacts with the Kutla in the French zone. After Torres came to an agreement with Franco, the republicans supported Mohammed al-Makki al-Nasiri in response and he founded the Party of Moroccan Unity. The rivalry between the two was personal. Until the end of the Protectorate, the two parties intermittently got support from the authorities. In February 1937, Makki Nasiri released the first issue of his newspaper, Moroccan Unity (al-Wahda al-Maghribiyya) and in March of the same year, Torres created the newspaper Freedom (al-Hurriyya).

=== Nationalism during and after WW2 ===
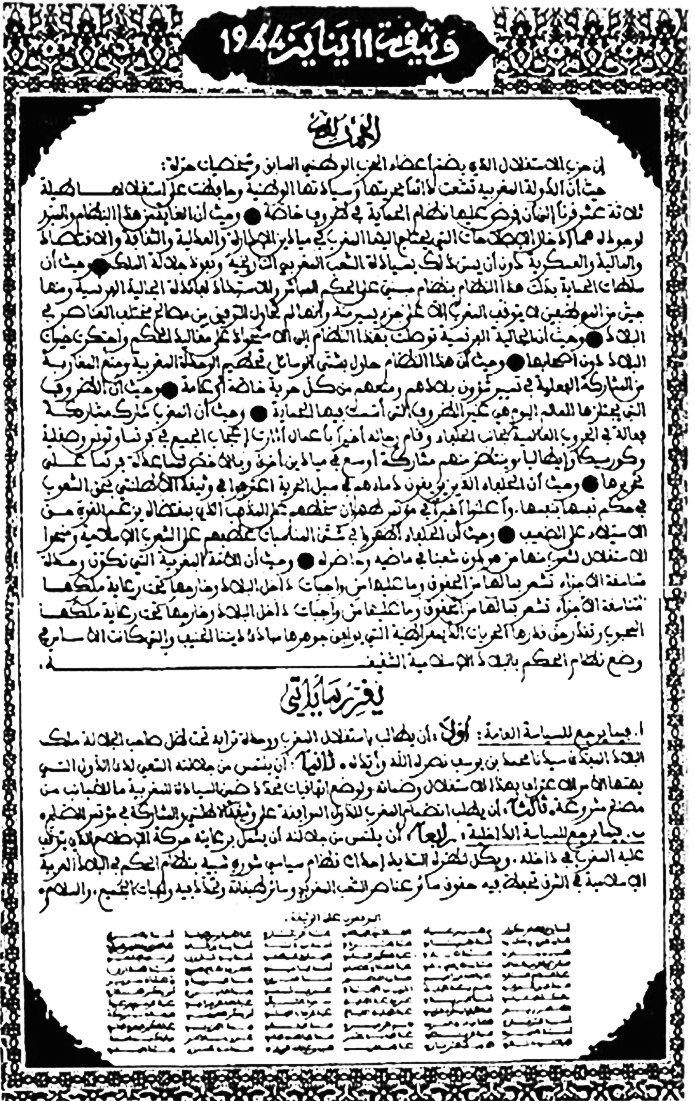
An image of the Proclamation of Independence handwritten in Mabsout Maghrebi script.

Three main parties emerged from the nationalist movement at this time: the Istiqlal Party, the Party of Democracy and Independence and the Moroccan Communist Party.

The Istiqlal Party was founded by former members of the Kutla in January 1944 or 1943. The Istiqlal was made up of a coalition of different political tendencies but it did not appeal to all Moroccans. For example, it was seen with suspicion by Sufi orders due to the Istiqlal's Salafism and Berber tribal leaders and members due to its Pan-Arabist rhetoric. The nationalism of the Istiqlal was bourgeois and was opposed to traditional institutions. The party originally represented an amalgam of a small and long-standing national conservative bourgeoise made of merchant families and religious scholars from Fes and a middle class made up of groups like teachers and doctors. The establishment of the Istiqlal reflected an ideological shift in the movement from reform to independence and a transition to a mass party format that included broad parts of the Moroccan population. Groups that preceded the Istiqlal like the Taifa, Zawiya and the Kutla only made efforts to reform the protectorate rather than demand full independence. According to al-Fassi, the shift from reform to independence was influenced by several factors including "the impact of the War, the Atlantic Charter, the Allied landings in North Africa, and the declaration of independence of Syria and Lebanon". Protectorate officials in writings from 1944 acknowledged that "the ideas of nation and independence are henceforth commonly acknowledged". Calls for both reform and independence did persist until formal independence. The Istiqlal later expanded to include a working class population represented through the Moroccan Workers' Union (UMT). It worked hard to expand its base to include groups like the urban working class. However, it did not find a lot of appeal in rural areas. The party chose Ahmed Balafrej as its head and Allal al-Fassi in the "purely honorary" role of zaʿīm of the Istiqlal. On the turn from reform to independence, al-Fassi says:

The real driving force behind the new approach has been the bitter experiences of the nationalist movement.... [which] had caused it thoroughly to despair of the protectorate rulers, who would receive all its sincere offers for cooperation with disdainful colonial arrogance.

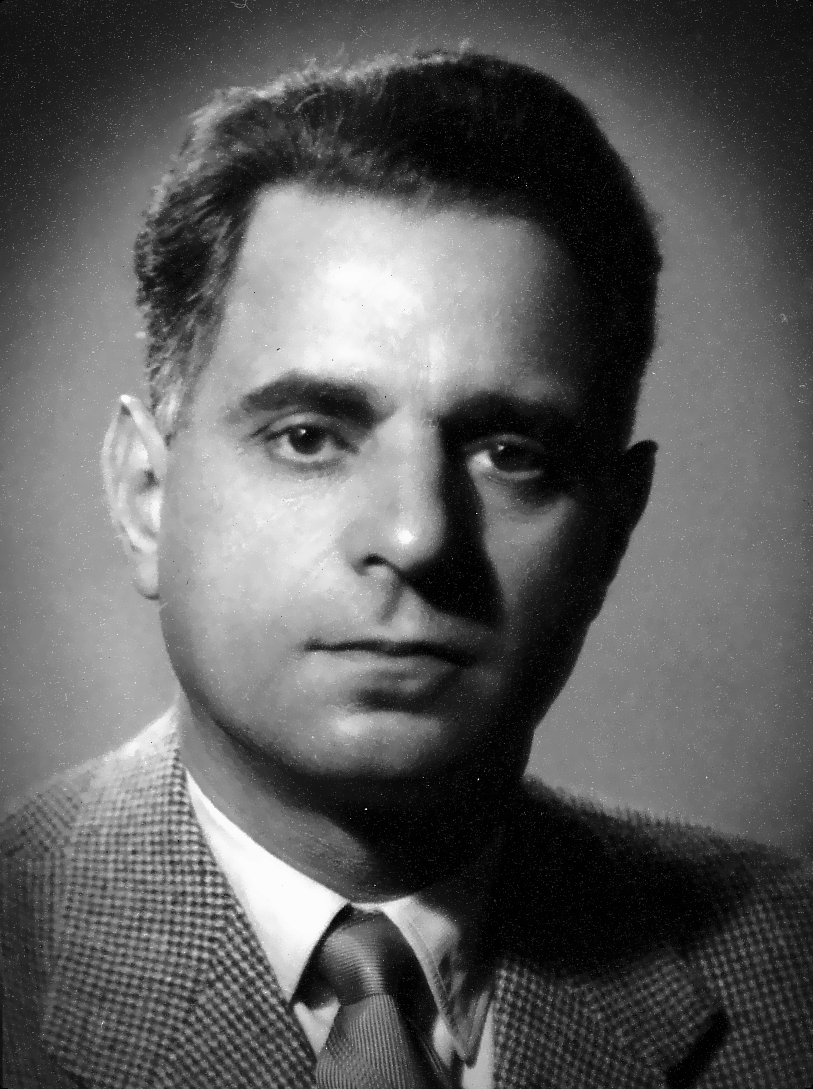
Ahmed Balafrej, first president of the Istiqlal Party c. 1950 – c. 1951

On January 11, 1944, they published their Independence Manifesto which called for "the independence of Morocco in its national entirety under the aegis of His Majesty Sidi Muhammad Bin Yusuf" and a democratic constitutional government that guaranteed the rights of "all elements in society". The manifesto also made other demands: Muhammad V negotiating independence, Morocco signing the Atlantic Charter and taking part in the peace conference. The manifesto had 56, 58 or 59 signatories. Among these signatories were figures like Ahmed Belafrej, Omar Benabdeljalil, Mehdi Ben Barka and Abderrahmane Youssoufi. The only female signatory was Malika al-Fassi. All these signatories agreed on independence but they did not agree on much more and did not have much in common. Signatories like Ben Barka and Youssoufi were left-wing for example while there were conservatives from old Makhzen families and men from the middle-class like journalists, teachers and doctors. There were also signatories from the Salafi movement. The ideology of the Istiqlal at this time was a mix of ideas including "democratic constitutionalism, Egyptian reformism, Islamic teachings, nineteenth century progressivism, and Third World anticolonialism, all broadly construed." On the manifesto, Allal al-Fassi says:

The Istiqlal Party, faithful to Moroccan aspirations, affirmed in a manifesto dated January 11st 1944 the impossibility of the evolution of the country in the context of the Protectorate. However, we see today that the French Republic wanted to adapt a political system in Morocco on behalf of the Istiqlal Party that is not suitable to the dignity and the blood of the Moroccan community. It is only the establishment of Moroccan independence that guarantees the integrity of its territory.

The sultan received the manifesto and approved it before it was sent to the secretary general. The manifesto was also presented to the British and American consulates in Rabat. The French reacted to the manifesto with hostility leading to the Istiqlal clarifying that they did not want to jeopardize the war effort and were against violence. There were peaceful demonstrations of support for the Istiqlal from Moroccans in the main cities. Charles de Gaulle reinstated the protectorate after WW2 ended and the manifesto was ignored which enraged previously apolitical Moroccans. The French also arrested some nationalist figures like Ahmed Belafrej and Mohamed Lyazidi accusing them of collaborating with the Axis. In response to these arrests, there was demonstrations, violence and more arrests showing that the Manifesto achieved its goal of rousing the Moroccan public. The French quelled these demonstrations using Senegalese Tirailleurs who were resented in Morocco particularly due to racism. As a result of these events, Berbers became closer to the nationalist cause and the sultan became more outspoken. Since the Istiqlal became deprived of its leadership as a result of the arrests, they had to go to younger militants to reorganise the party and campaign to win international support.

In order to resolve this crisis, the French appointed a new Resident-General over Morocco, Eric Labonne who enacted a more liberal policy like freeing nationalist leaders and legalising parties. Some of the leaders that returned included Allal al-Fassi and Mohammed Hassan Ouazzani. These exiles increased their legitimacy in the eyes of the nation and their return was met with banquets and parades. Allal al-Fassi took over the leadership of the Istiqlal and founded the Arabic newspaper Al-Alam in September 1946. A French newspaper L'Opinion du Peuple was founded in March 1947. Ouazzani also founded a new party, the Party of Democracy and Independence.

Between 1947 and 1956, the Istiqlal went through a period of significant expansion. In 1944, party membership was estimated at three thousand later expanding to ten thousand in 1947 and after 1952, one hundred thousand. In the 50s, it eventually reached two hundred and fifty thousand members.

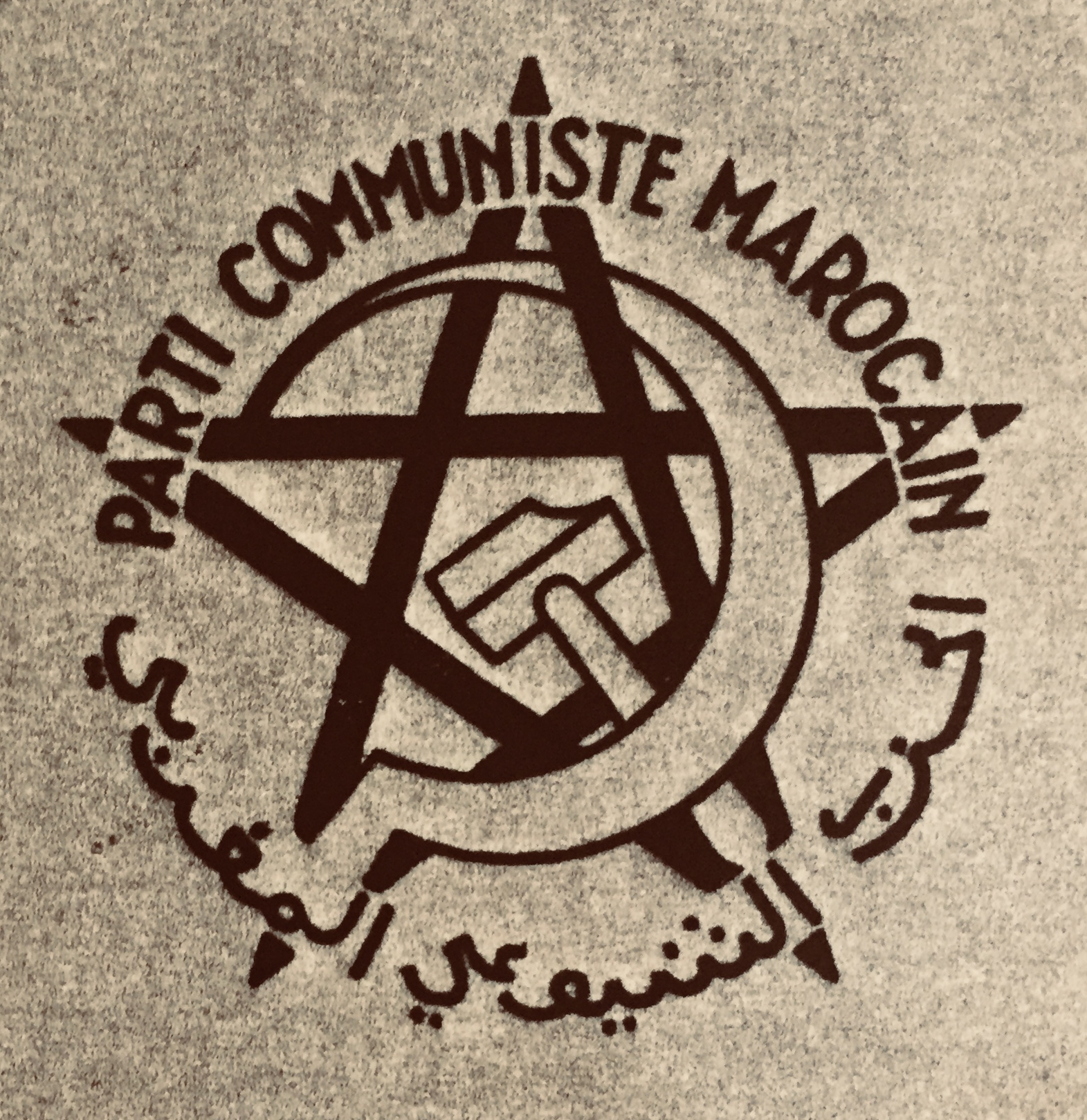
Logo of the Moroccan Communist Party

The Moroccan Communist Party (MCP) was clandestinely formed in 1942 by Léon Sultan and Ali Yata. They were initially opposed to Moroccan independence as they believed it would just transform Morocco from a French protectorate to an American one and they even went as far to controversially categorise the nationalist movement's struggle as "Hitlerian fascist provocation". According to Ali Yata, who adopted the leadership of the party after Léon Sultan's death, this stance upset many Moroccan activists and to reconcile with the nationalist movement, Yata eventually signed the Independence Manifesto. In August 1946, the sultan met with MCP leaders including Ali Yata to the shock of many granting more legitimacy to the party. This represented the shift from being just a branch of the French Communist Party to a Moroccan, patriotic and monarchist party. The MCP manifesto published in August 1946 called for an "A United and Independent Morocco—a National Moroccan Front". One of the slogans for the party was "Join the Moroccan Communist Party because it is the true nationalist party of Morocco". The Moroccan Communist Party became the main mean for Moroccan Jews to express their patriotism and participation in the national liberation movement partly due to its universalist, expansive definition of "Moroccan" when other parties adopted an Arabo-Muslim Moroccan national identity. In response to routine attacks that they were "foreign" like from the Istiqlal Party, Abdesselam Bourquia, a MCP Central Committee member, pointed out in the Arabic-language newspaper Hayat ech Chaab that

[Joseph Stalin] had resolved the national question ... he speaks of the "nation" and describes the process of national evolution. Many compatriots imagine that the "Nation" is a group of people, practicing the same religion, speaking the same language, sharing a common origin. They categorize Arabs and Muslims, who live in diverse countries and who do not speak the same language, as "the Arab Nation" or the "Muslim Nation." Stalin demonstrated that a "Nation" is a group of people, historically bound together, sharing a common language, a common land, and a shared spirit. We should not say "Arab Nation" or "Muslim Nation," but rather "Moroccan Nation."

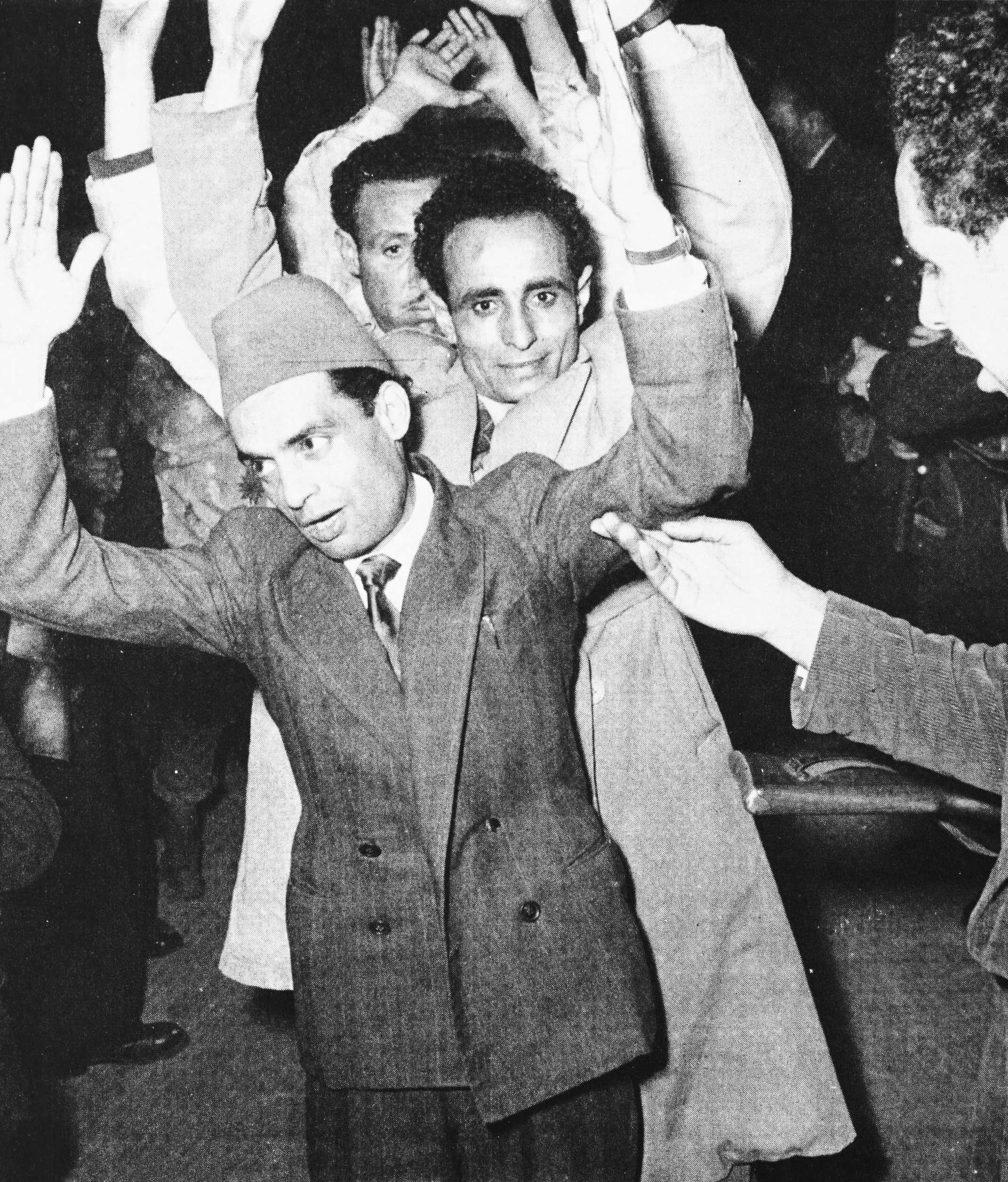
The round-up of Moroccan labour leaders, 9 December 1952

In November 1952, Tunisian labor leader and pro-nationalist Farhat Hached was assassinated in Tunis. This led to riots in Casablanca on December 8. These riots began on December 7 in one of the biggest Casablanca shantytowns Carrières centrales where a crowd of 5000 according to local press descended upon shops that stayed upon despite the strike and descended into a police station. Over 3500 workers organised by the Casablanca trade unions staged a demonstration out of sympathy. It was disrupted brutally by French police. This led to a rampage by Europeans into the native quarter which led to hundreds being killed or injured. 400 people died in the clashes between the police and Moroccan rioters. Boniface, the French police chief in charge of the Casablanca region, used the riots as an excuse to violently repress trade union members and general Moroccan population leading to a massacre of Carrières centrales.

=== Sultan of the Istiqlal ===
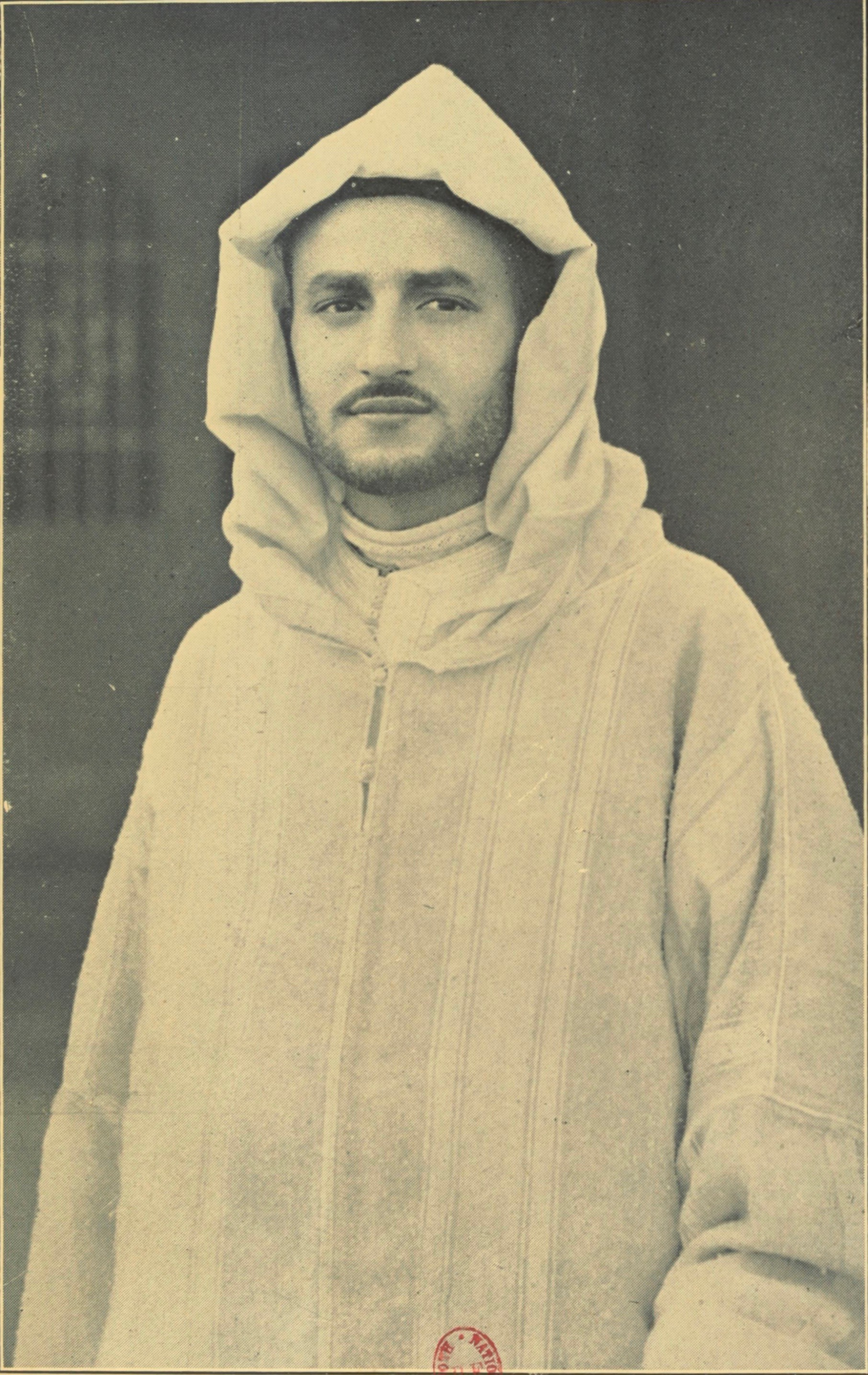
Mohammed V c. 1934

Under the protectorate, the sultan became a symbol of Moroccan nationalism in part because of unintended French policies and strategies pursued by the nationalists. This began from the early 1940s. While the sultan was sympathetic to the goals of the nationalists in the 1930s, he did not openly ally with them out of fear of provoking the French. He did protest against some French policies during this time like an attempt to move the administration of France from the Ministry of Foreign Affairs to the Ministry of Overseas France. Moroccan nationalists believed that the monarchy represented an important national symbol and that it generated mass support, especially in rural areas. They believed that winning the sultan over would be important to their cause. The sultan thought cooperating with the nationalists increased his legitimacy and publicity.

The nationalists co-opted symbols invented by the French and Lyautey for the makhzen like the Moroccan flag and anthem as well as invented symbols of Moroccan national unity. The Throne Day was one of the national holidays invented in 1933 by Moroccan nationalists and it commemorated the anniversary of Mohammed V's ascension. The first Throne Day was celebrated on 18 November 1933.

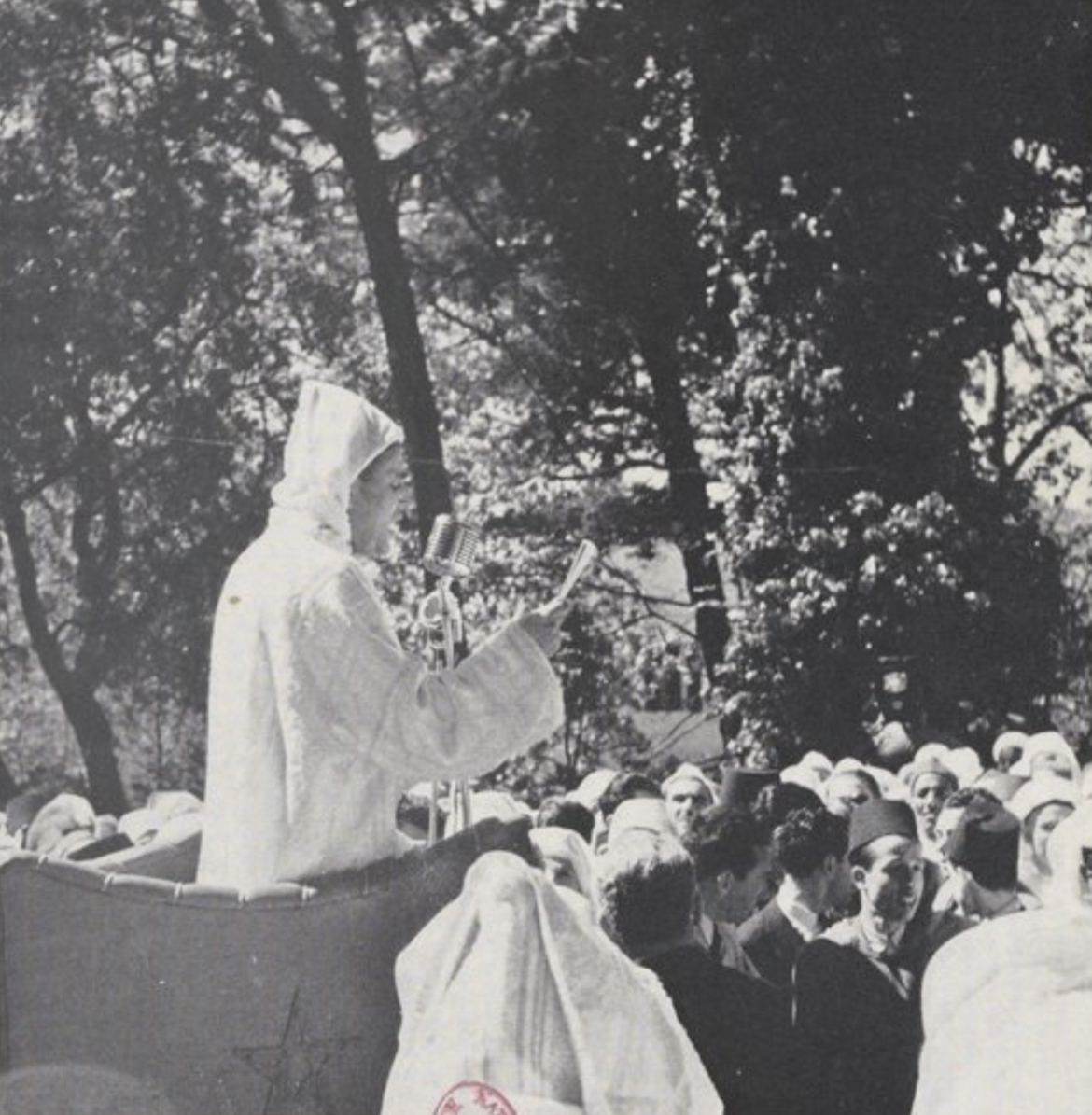
Sultan Mohammed V delivering the Tangier Speech, 9 April 1947

Mohammed V had secret meetings with nationalist leaders who had not been yet exiled or were still in the country like Ahmed Belafrej, Omar Benabdeljalil, Mohamed Lyazidi, Mohamed Ghazi and Mohamed El Fassi. He also encouraged the Istiqlal to form and draft the Independence Manifesto. On 8 April 1947, Mohammed V made a historic visit to Tangier where he delivered the Tangier Speech in the Mendoubia Gardens the next day. The speech being in Tangier which was an international condominium at the time ensured that the speech would gain international attention. This speech was the first time he publicly deviated against the French Protectorate policy. For example, he did not pay tribute to France in the speech. He was supposed to say "the source of liberty that conducts the country towards prosperity and progress" referring to France. According to his son, Hassan, he did not pay tribute because of the 1947 Casablanca massacre. Furthermore, he affirmed "Moroccan unity" as well as the country's "Arabo-Islamic destiny":

Morocco earnestly desires to acquire its full rights. It goes without saying that Morocco is a country attached by the strongest ties to the Arab countries of the East, naturally desiring that these ties grow stronger and stronger, since the Arab League has become an important organization that plays a great role in world politics. The Arab countries form a single nation; whether in Tangier or Damascus, this is but one nation.

As a result of the speech, the monarchy and royal family's popularity soared as the Mohammed V increasingly became a symbol of the nation with his portrait appearing everywhere. Official Moroccan historiography marks the year 1947 as the first stage of the Revolution of the King and the People. This speech reinforced Morocco's connections with the broader current of Arabism. Mohammed V praised the establishment of the "noble" Arab League "which strengthened the bonds between Arabs wherever they are found, enabled their kings and leaders in the [Arab] East and [Arab] West to unite in action and in directing their forward march toward religious guidance, Islamic glory, and Arab honour". Allal al-Fassi, while writing approvingly of the speech, similarly emphasised the importance of "achieving a unity of outlook" between Morocco and other Arab countries, "to ensure that Morocco won’t be outpaced and fall back, nor be molded in a non-Arab orientation and outlook". The historian Bruce Maddy-Weitzman noted that for Mohammed V "being Arab" was then important for forming a collective identity among Moroccans as well as promoting his religious and political legitmacy along with reaching out to get political support from Arab states and societies.

Allying with the Arab League and solidarity with Middle Eastern nationalism upset the French. Furthermore, the support extended to the US and the exclusion of French in the speech further added on to this. The French blamed the resident-general Eric Labonne for being too lenient and failing to control the sultan and they had him replaced with the hard-line Alphonse Juin. Juin was given instructions authorising him to threaten the sultan with deposition if he continued resisting the French. He also made it clear that the French had no plans for independence of the Maghreb.

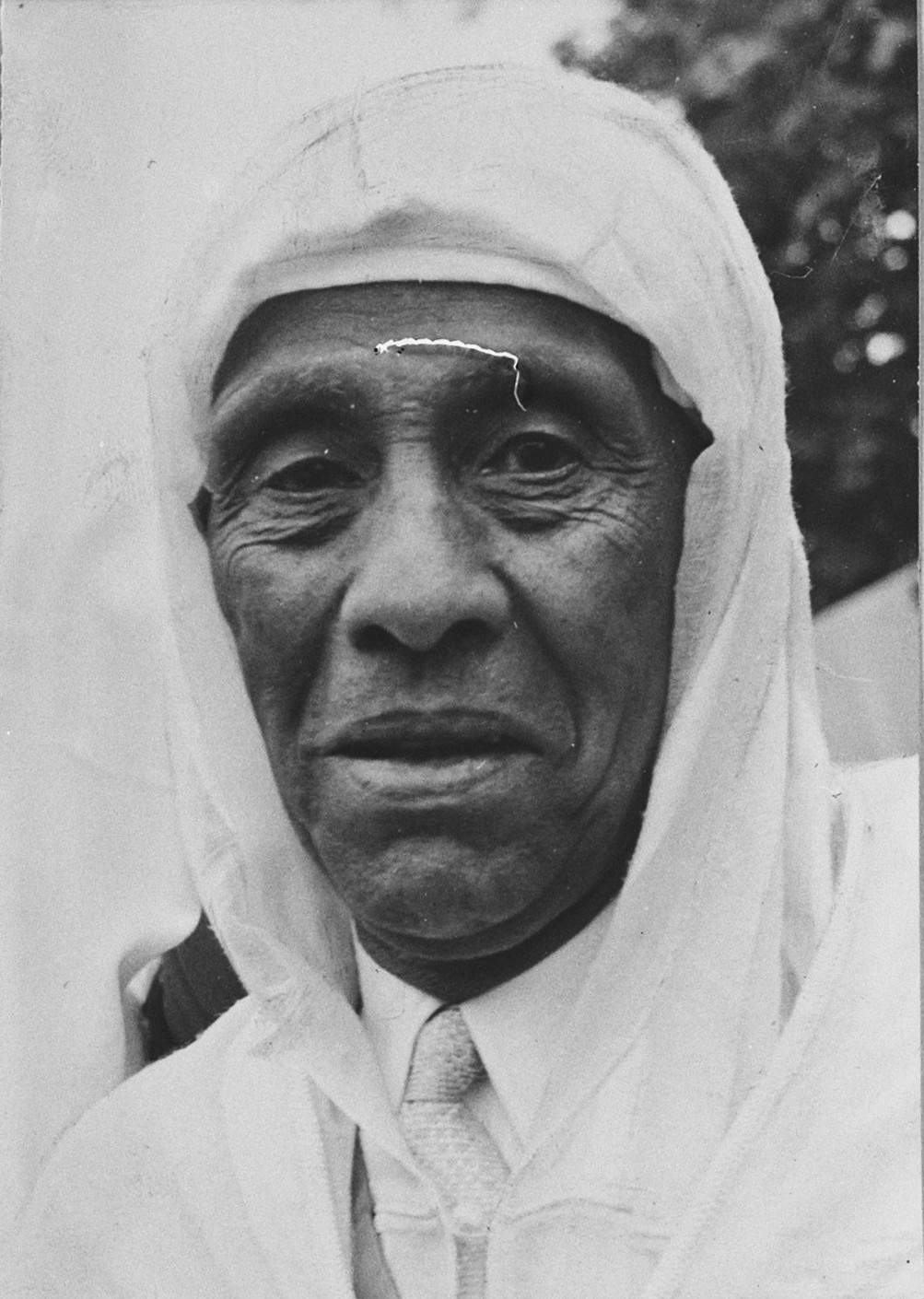
Thami al-Glaoui accused the sultan of being a communist and atheist labelling him as the "Sultan of the Istiqlal" rather than of Morocco.

On August 20, 1953, the French deposed Mohammed V exiling him to Corsica then to Madagascar. This along with attempts to exile or imprison much of the Istiqlal leadership angered Moroccans and it only increased Mohammed V's legitimacy and charisma. In the countryside, legends about him performing miracles spread. For example, some people claimed his face appeared on the moon. In response to this deposition, the independence struggle intensified including religious protests, economic boycotts and armed attacks. There was an escalation of violence with terrorism and counterterrorism leading the French to send a quarter of a million French soldiers to Morocco to fight against thousands of guerilla forces. The sultan's desposition and exile created a "symbolic focal point for Moroccan nationalism" and the Istiqlal built up Mohammed's image as the "essence of Morocco's independence hopes". The nationalists presented the restoration of the sultan as a religious duty and the campaign to end the deposition was painted as the "Revolution of the King and the People".

Grand caid and pasha of Marrakesh, Thami al-Glaoui, had a "prominent role" in the deposition of the sultan. The deposition also had support from prominent Sufi leader Abd al-Hayy al-Kettani. Glaoui organised petitions and a campaign in support of the deposition and the first petition on 20 March 1953 in Marrakesh was signed by 20 caids. He surrounded the cities of Rabat and Fes with Berber warriors to depose the sultan:

When Sultan Mohamed refused, the southern rebels, joined by the powerful 15,000-strong Kettani tariqa from the Middle Atlas region, marched towards Rabat under the slogan 'Long live General Guillaume [the general resident], long live Franco-Moroccan cooperation, long live the brotherhoods'.

The French categorised this deposition as an "Amazigh uprising against a sultan who was regarded as too closely allied to the urbanised, educated and Westernised elites". A distant cousin of the sultan, Mohammed Ben Aarafa, was proclaimed the new Sultan on 15 August 1953 as totally removing the Alawi dynasty would not have been possible.

=== Violent resistance after Sultan's exile ===
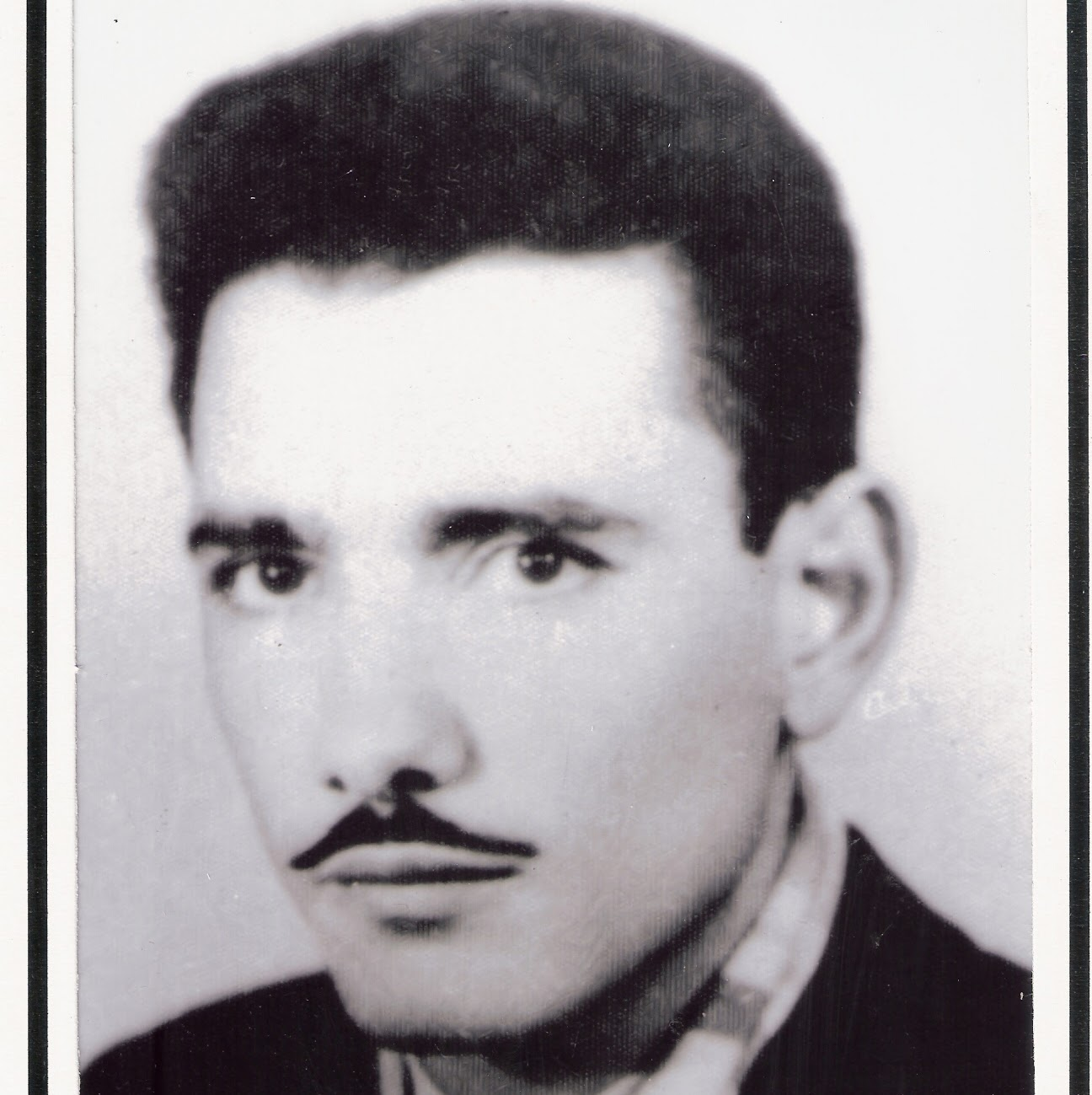
Muhammad Zarqtuni

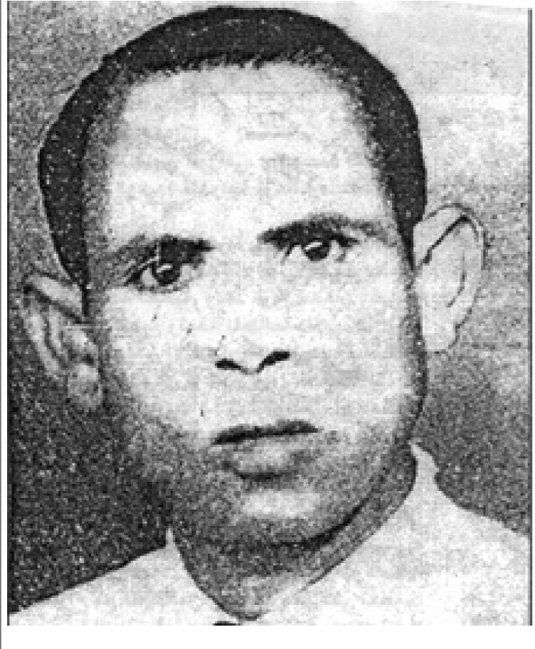
Allal ben Abdallah

According to the political writer Marvine Howe, after the exile of Mohammed V, "The nationalist movement, with its political leadership silenced, turned to violence, and the Moroccan resistance was reborn". This turn to violence was through urban terrorism. These terrorist attacks included things like arson, shootings, knifings, sabotage, stonings and bomb explosions. In his Cairo exile, Allal al-Fassi in response to the sultan's exile made a call for armed struggle on radio which spread throughout all of Morocco. The internal leadership of the Istiqlal (those who were not jailed) condemned the violence. Along with the violence, there were demonstrations in Moroccan cities by both men and women.

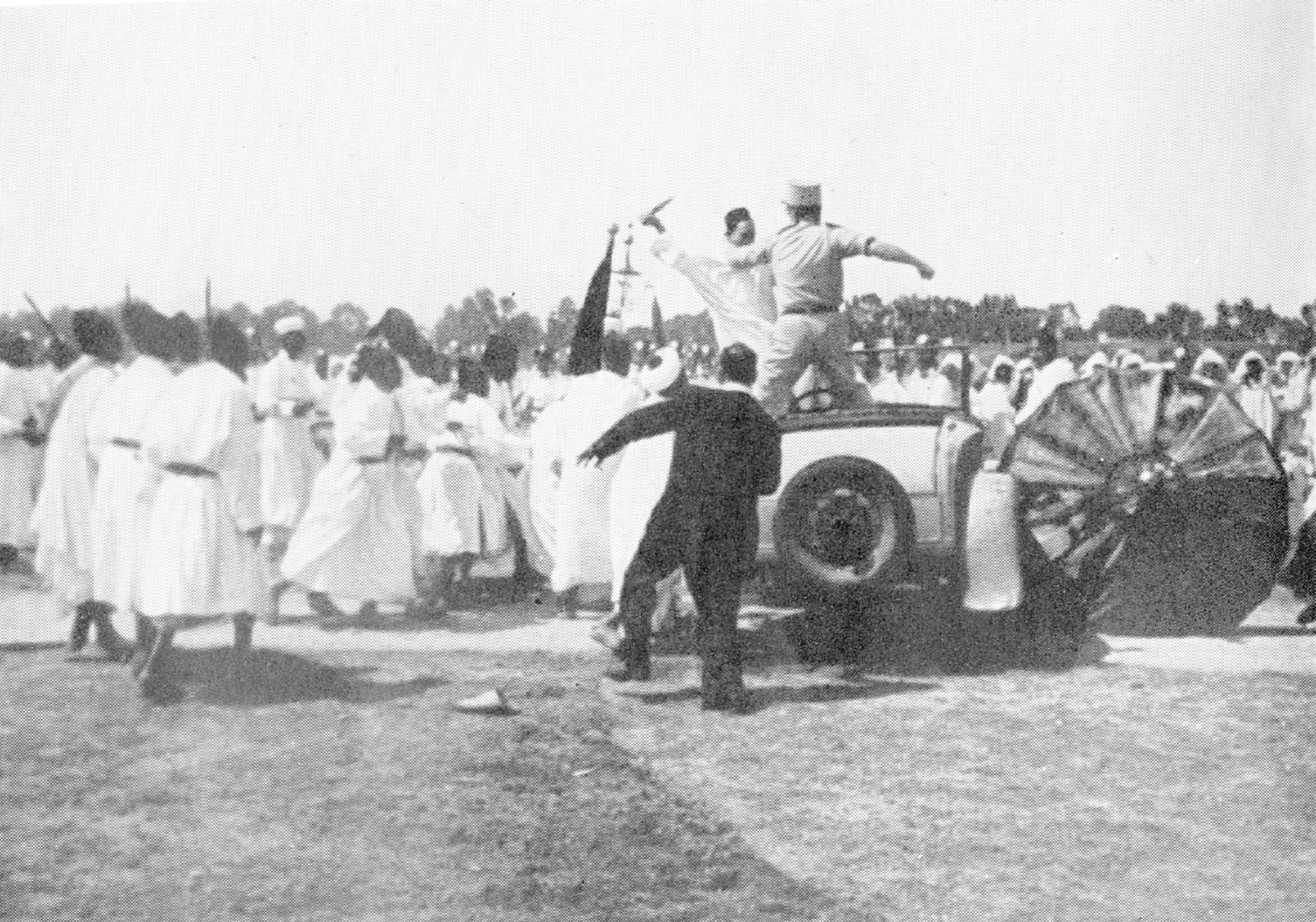
Allal ben Abdallah attempts to stab Mohammed Ben Arafa

The first martyr of the resistance was house painter Allal ben Abdallah who attempted to assassinate the French appointed-sultan Mohammed Ben Aarafa on 11 September 1953. In the central market of Casablanca, on Christmas Eve of September, there was a huge explosion that killed 23 people. This act was claimed by the resistance and the head of the "Secret Organisation", Muhammad Zarqtuni, was arrested and accused of planning the attack. Rather than reveal the secrets of the organisation, he committed suicide. Zarqtuni's sister, Khaddouj, was also a member of the resistance in Casablanca.

Riots overrun Casablanca due to discontent with French rule. Universal Newsreel, 21 July 1955

The Secret Organisation was founded by the Istiqlal Party. Other urban groups were the left wing Black Crescent, Usad al-tahrir and the Organization of the Black Hand. The urban resistance launched 4,520 violent attacks targeting infrastructure in Moroccan cities, mostly Casablanca, between 20 August 1953 and 6 April 1956. There were also terrorist bombings and attempted assassinations against the French colon community. According to the historian William A. Hoisington Jr, between December 1953 and March 1955, there were 1222 terrorist (and counter-terrorist) attacks mostly in Casablanca (dubbed "Morocco's Chicago") which claimed 259 deaths and 732 wounded. The historian Susan Gilson Miller says "Violent attacks became a daily occurrence". Under the French protectorate, Casablanca functioned as a "focal point" for European settlers, mostly of French origin, to migrate to. By 1950, Casablanca had a population of 158,000 Europeans as opposed to 414,500 Muslims and 72,000 Jews. The presence of French settlers was a factor that affected nationalist violence. Morocco had the second largest settler population in the French empire.

The resistance was initially mostly urban until the Oued Zem massacre on 20 August 1955 by Sma'la tribesmen where it then shifted to the bled (the countryside). An estimated 60–100 Europeans had died along with many more pro-French Moroccans. The disproportionate French response to the riots that emerged after the massacre involving disproportionately killing Moroccans using jet aircraft, tanks and artillery led to the Moroccan population being enraged further eventually leading up to independence. The involvement of Middle Atlas Berber tribesmen with the Sma'la in the Oued Zem massacre ended the myth of the "Berber solidarity" with the protectorate. Even in the Meknes military academy, where many sons of Middle Atlas Berber notables would be sent to, a report revealed that among the students there was a "strong sentiment" that Morocco should affirm its Muslim character and strengthen its ties with the Arab world specifically Nasserist Egypt.

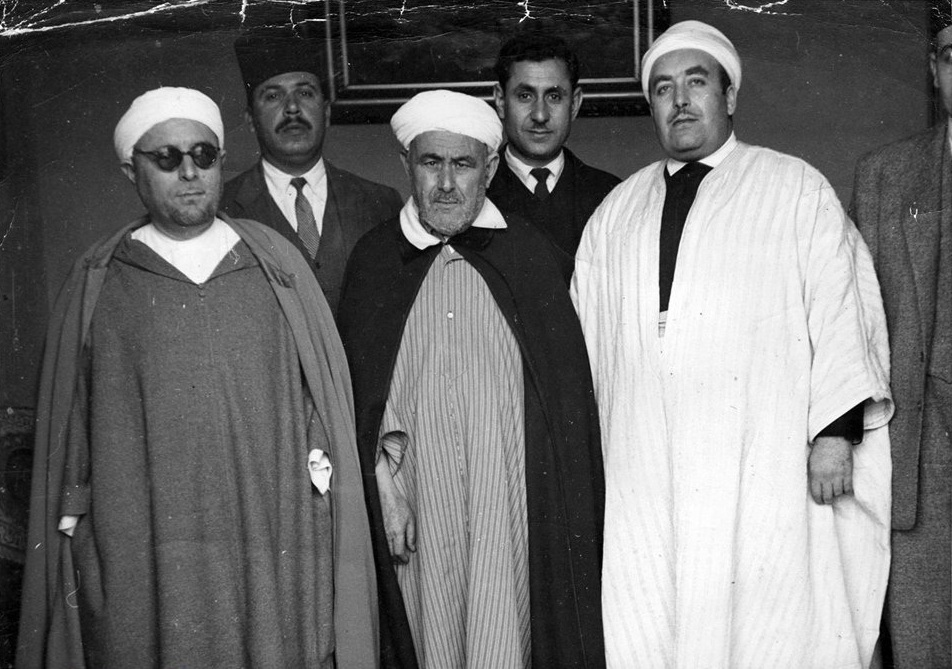
Abd el-Krim (centre) c. 1950

In the autumn of 1955, the Moroccan Army of Liberation (MLA) was formed in the countryside. The MLA was largely made up of tribal Berbers from the Middle Atlas and Rif mountains and later Sahrawi nomads. The MLA's leaders were largely Moroccans and Arabs. For example, a cousin of Allal al-Fassi, Abd al-Kabir al-Fassi, was an MLA leader. The MLA claimed to have 2000 soldiers but only had 700. They were armed with weapons pillaged from French depots and also smuggled weapons from Egypt. The MLA initially praised Allal al-Fassi as their nominal leader but when he declared the jihad ended, they distanced themselves from him with their own declaration from their high command saying no one spoke in their name or could mediate their relationship with the sultan. The MLA joined the struggle launching its offensive from Spanish Morocco on October 1 or October 2, 1955. Some of the things they attacked were police posts and offices of the Affaires indigenes. There was also the Arab Maghreb Liberation Committee that preceded the MLA and set up the groundwork for armed resistance against French colonialism. It was established in Cairo in 1948 and was led by Riffian leader Abd el-Krim as its titular head.

According to the military historian Anthony Clayton, from 1 July 1954 to 30 June 1955, 41 Europeans and 254 Moroccans were killed with more injured in terrorist attacks. In response to the rise in violence, settlers enacted a counter-terrorist campaign through the Organisation de Défense Anti-Terroriste (ODA-T). The journalist Stephen Hughes writes that the French extremists would cruise around Casablanca in black Citroens indiscriminately firing on Moroccans and terrorising citizens. French General Pierre Billotte sent a division to Morocco after the formation of the MLA and a resurgence of urban resistance bringing the total number of soldiers in Morocco to more than 105,000.

In March 1956, Morocco's declaration of independence was signed with Spain quitting the northern zone in April.

== Nationalism after independence ==
=== Greater Morocco and Western Sahara ===
Greater Morocco as claimed by the Istiqlal Party, 1956.

The concept of "Greater Morocco" was first put forward by Moroccan nationalists before independence. The figure that "Greater Morocco" is attributed to specifically is prominent nationalist leader Allal al-Fassi. In July 1956, he put forward a map of Greater Morocco in the Istiqlal newspaper, Al-Alam, which included all of Mauritania, parts of Western Algeria and a section of Northern Mali and all of the Spanish Sahara. According to al-Fassi, the independence of Morocco was incomplete without these borders:

... so long as Tangier is not liberated from its international status, so long as the Spanish deserts of the south, the Sahara from Tindouf and Atar and the Algerian-Moroccan borderlands are not liberated from their trusteeship, our independence will remain incomplete and our first duty will be to carry on action to liberate the country and to unify it.

Initially, only a few were interested in Greater Morocco but in part because of Allal al-Fassi's charisma it gradually won over the support of the rest of the Moroccan government.

Before the development of Sahrawi nationalism, many Sahrawis fought alongside Moroccans against the French and Spanish. Thousands of Sahrawis joined the Moroccan Army of Liberation (MLA). While the leaders were largely Moroccan, most of the guerrilla groups strength were Sahrawi nomads.

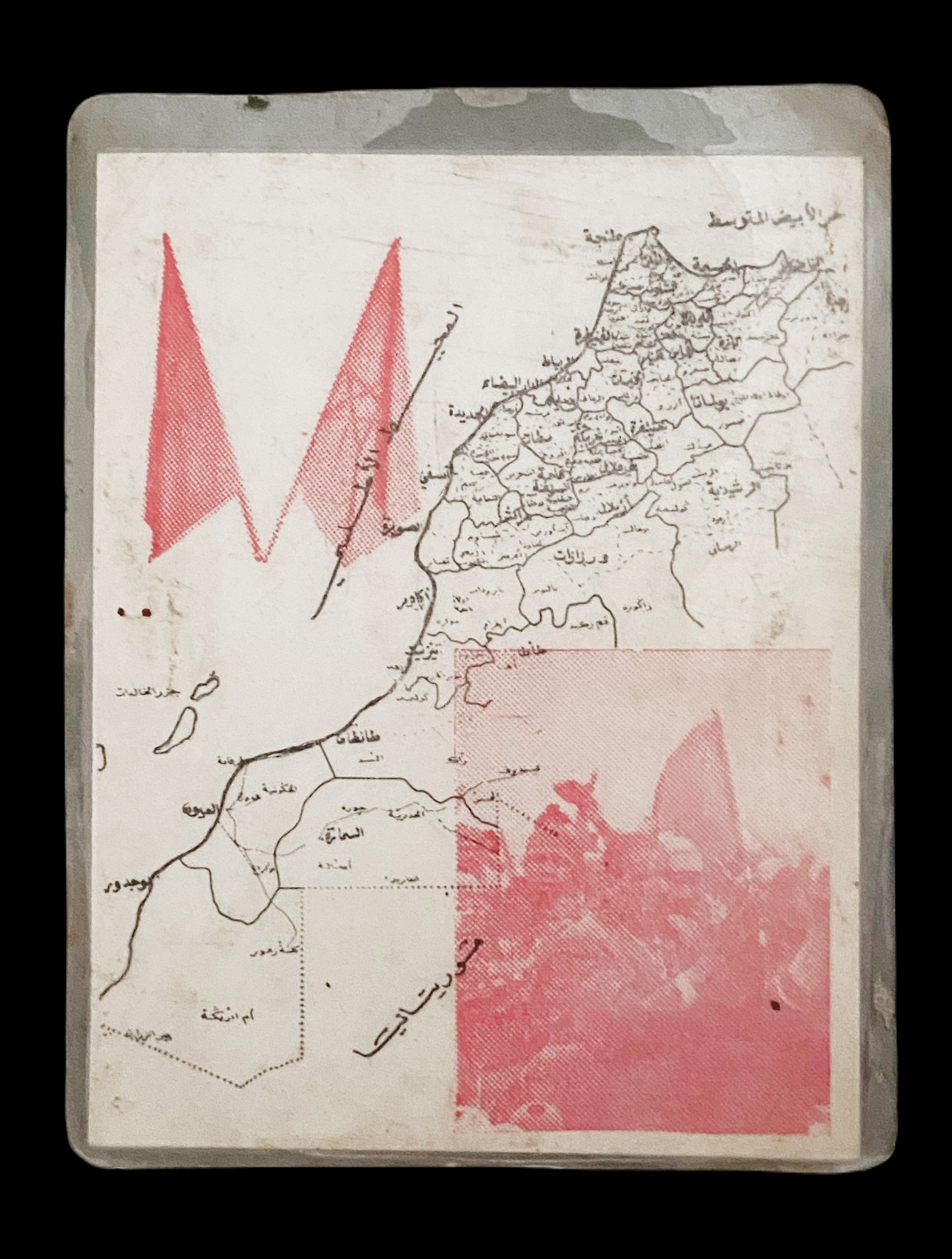
Card with a map of Morocco given to Green March volunteers

The Green March has been described as the "most nationalist" response possible to the ICJ Advisory opinion on Western Sahara. In the Green March, 350,000 Moroccan civilians and 20,000 soldiers marched into the territory of Western Sahara and later returned. This demonstration of Moroccan national will led to Spain withdrawing. The Green March also brought dissident parties like those who formed the National Bloc, the National Union of Popular Forces (UNFP) and Istiqlal, behind the monarchy's nationalist claims. Other parties joined the nationalist fervour caused by the Green March like the Party of Progress and Socialism, the successor of the Moroccan Communist Party, whose leader went to Eastern Europe to persuade communist states in favour of Morocco's claim over the Sahara. Across the political spectrum, regaining the Sahara became a dogma and the balance of power was shifted in favour of the monarchy. According to the scholar David Mednicoff, by launching the Green March, "Hassan followed his father's model—he found a nationalist cause that he himself could embody". After the shift in focus to the Western Sahara, government-sponsored media started referring to Hassan as "the Reunifier" and 5 November became an annual holiday.

In the eyes of Moroccan nationalists, Western Sahara is a colonial invention alongside Algeria to a lesser extent. Sahrawi nationalism would then be an artificial construct due to European colonialism supported by an even larger artificial construct.

=== Internet far right ===
The flag popularly attributed to the Marinid dynasty has become a symbol of Moroccan ultranationalism.

Coinciding with the rise of the far right globally, nationalist and right wing sentiments and discourse have become more popular in Moroccan online spaces. This has led to Facebook meme pages to reproduce "ultranationalist, antifeminist, and antimigration themes". Historically, Morocco did not have a far right political party. Various elements like maps, memes, art, symbols and icons have been used online by non-partisan social actors who consider themselves right-wing and nationalist to engage in online discourse within the framework of what they call a Moroccan or Moorish nationalist right (or RwN). This far-right trend has been referred to by Moroccan French-language media as the "Moorish Movement". Memes created by these Facebook pages have focused on a number of themes and symbols like the former king Hassan II and old flags attributed to Morocco. They exhibit a "nostalgic tone" for a bygone era even despite the brutal repression of the Years of Lead. These memes have been used to promote "ultra- and ethnonationalist, misogynist, and racist" points of view whilst expressing hate against political and ideological enemies like Islamists, Marxists and Feminists. These far right pages have differing attitudes towards the Berber population of Morocco with some reluctant to concede space to Berber nationalism whilst others take pride in it welcoming Morocco's multi-ethnicity.

== Islam and Moroccan nationalism ==
Historically, the Moroccan nationalist movement emphasised Islam as a unifying force. Specifically, the Salafi movement was a major influence over Moroccan nationalism. According to the historian Daniel Zisenwine, "Salafi ideology was of paramount importance in the crystallization of Moroccan nationalist political and social positions". One prominent Moroccan nationalist who was a Salafi was Allal al-Fassi who is described as the "most dominant standard-bearer of Moroccan Salafism". He saw Salafism as synonymous with nationalism.

The link between Islam and Moroccan nationalism persisted even after independence. The Green March, for example, took its name from the symbolic colour of Islam. The Moroccan volunteers who took part in the Green March carried Qurans with them and red and green banners representing Morocco and Islam. They were also asked to recite Surah al-Fatiha when crossing the Sahara. Many of these volunteers were also draped in parchments containing Quranic verses or national flags. Since the march portrayed itself as Islam beating back or Morocco liberating itself from Western invaders and imperialism, the success of the march had religious significance for many people. Hassan II portrayed it as a jihad against the Spanish and portrayed himself as an imam of the community.

== Historiography ==
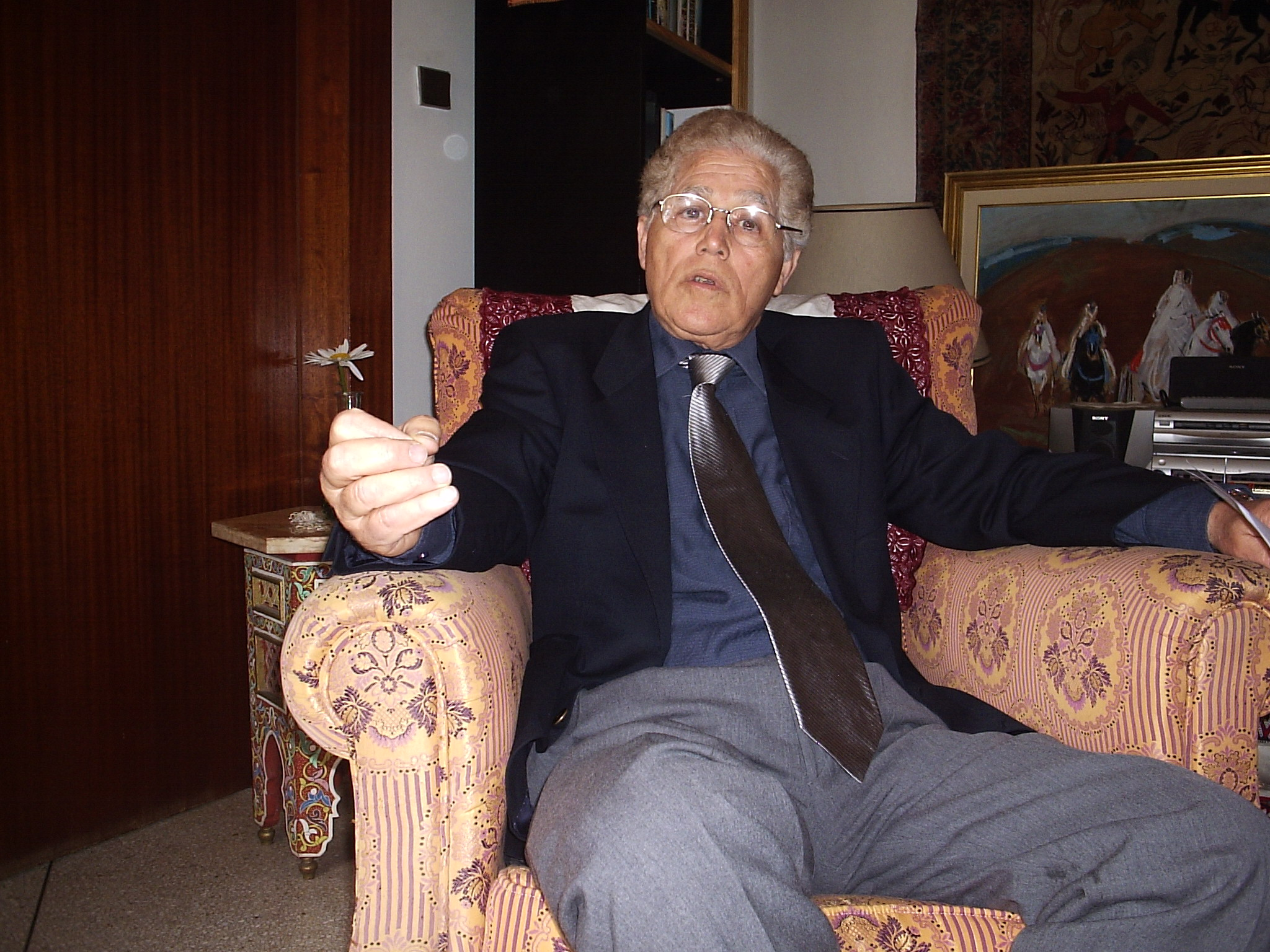
Abdallah Laroui has been described as a "historian of Moroccan nationalism".

In the 1930s, a nationalist strand emerged in Moroccan historiography intensifying after independence. It was opposed to the French colonial historiography and sought to decolonise Moroccan history by favouring local sources over colonial ones. From the 1960s, Moroccan historians belonging to this nationalist strand wrote works in opposition to this French historiography. While the purpose of the French colonial historiography was to justify colonialism, the nationalist historiography stressed the Arab and independent nature of Morocco and Islamic continuity in Morocco. French historiography also aimed to present historical antagonisms between Arabs and Berbers in Morocco to align the Berbers with the French and exclude the Arab. On the other hand, nationalist historiography painted an historical alliance between the two ethnic communities. Nationalist historiography also presented colonialism as a "painful rupture" in Moroccan history.

An example of this nationalist historiography is Allal al-Fassi's "classic" nationalist history depicting Morocco cruelly overwhelmed by an imperialist West until the arrival of the Istiqlal Party. This history gives a marginal role to the rural populations and subaltern classes whilst also defining imperialism politically rather than economically. Scholars and historian like Susan Gilson Miller and Edmund Burke III critiqued this nationalist historiography and its affect in studying Moroccan history due to their focus on the urban Arab male elite and exclusion of other groups like minorities, women and peasants from their historical narrative. The prominent Moroccan historian Abdallah Laroui also critiqued this nationalist historiography:

In the nineteenth century, two mutually hostile historiographies, the one colonial, the other nationalist, came into being, and developed in opposite directions - if not in all their aspects, at least in their view of reality. Colonial historiography treated its subject most adequately in its beginnings, while that of the nationalists acquired its content at the end of the process

— The History of the Maghrib: An Interpretive Essay

== Sources ==
- Wyrtzen, Jonathan (2016-01-05). Making Morocco: Colonial Intervention and the Politics of Identity. Cornell University Press. ISBN 978-1-5017-0425-3.
- Zisenwine, Daniel (2010-09-30). The Emergence of Nationalist Politics in Morocco: The Rise of the Independence Party and the Struggle Against Colonialism After World War II. Bloomsbury Publishing. ISBN 978-0-85771-853-2.
- Miller, Susan Gilson (2013-04-15). A History of Modern Morocco. Cambridge University Press. ISBN 978-0-521-81070-8.
- Lawrence, Adria (2013-09-16). Imperial Rule and the Politics of Nationalism: Anti-Colonial Protest in the French Empire. Cambridge University Press. ISBN 978-1-107-03709-0.
- Cabré, Yolanda Aixelà (2018). "Imazighen and Arabs in the Spanish Protectorate : A Review of the Construction on the Contemporary Moroccan Nation". In Cabré, Yolanda Aixelà (ed.). In the Footsteps of Spanish Colonialism in Morocco and Equatorial Guinea: The Handling of Cultural Diversity and the Socio-Political Influence of Transnational Migration. LIT Verlag Münster. ISBN 978-3-643-91010-3.
- Pennell, C. R. (2000). Morocco Since 1830: A History. Hurst. ISBN 978-1-85065-273-1.
- Calderwood, Eric (2018-04-09). Colonial al-Andalus: Spain and the Making of Modern Moroccan Culture. Harvard University Press. ISBN 978-0-674-98579-7.
- Ait Mous, Fadma (2013-12-01). "The Moroccan nationalist movement: from local to national networks". The Journal of North African Studies. 18 (5): 737–752. doi:10.1080/13629387.2013.849888. ISSN 1362-9387.
- Howe, Marvine (2005-06-30). Morocco: The Islamist Awakening and Other Challenges. Oxford University Press. ISBN 978-0-19-534698-5.
- Ennaji, Moha (2005-12-05). Multilingualism, Cultural Identity, and Education in Morocco. Springer Science & Business Media. ISBN 978-0-387-23980-4.
- Sater, James (2016-06-09). Morocco: Challenges to tradition and modernity (2nd ed.). Routledge. ISBN 978-1-317-57397-5.
- Fenner, Sofia (2023-07-11). Shouting in a Cage: Political Life After Authoritarian Co-optation in North Africa. Columbia University Press. ISBN 978-0-231-55750-4.
- Clayton, Anthony (2014-06-06). The Wars of French Decolonization. Routledge. ISBN 978-1-317-89486-5.
- Rinehart, Robert (1985). "Historical Setting". In Nelson, Harold D. (ed.). Morocco, a Country Study (5th ed.). The American University. pp. 1–95.
- Gershovich, Moshe (2012-10-12). French Military Rule in Morocco: Colonialism and its Consequences. Routledge. ISBN 978-1-136-32587-8.
- Lawrence, Adria (2010-08-27). "Driven to Arms? The Escalation to Violence in Nationalist Conflicts". In Chenoweth, Erica; Lawrence, Adria (eds.). Rethinking Violence: States and Non-State Actors in Conflict. MIT Press. pp. 143–173. ISBN 978-0-262-26575-1.
- Salhi, Mohamed (2025-06-16). "Reinventing the Right in Morocco: Right-Wing Populist Discourses and Sentiments in Moroccan Online Spaces". Middle East Law and Governance. 17 (1): 111–144. doi:10.1163/18763375-20251449. ISSN 1876-3367.
- Moreno-Almeida, Cristina (2024-05-16). Memes, Monsters, and the Digital Grotesque. Oxford University Press. ISBN 978-0-19-893089-1.
- Moreno-Almeida, Cristina; Gerbaudo, Paolo (2021-10-01). "Memes and the Moroccan Far-Right". The International Journal of Press/Politics. 26 (4): 882–906. doi:10.1177/1940161221995083. ISSN 1940-1612.
- Zisenwine, Daniel (2009). "'Ulama', tribalism and the national struggle in Morocco, 1944-1956". In Hatina, Meir (ed.). Guardians of Faith in Modern Times: 'Ulamaʼ' in the Middle East. Brill. pp. 196–197. ISBN 978-90-04-16953-1.
- Stenner, David (2019). Globalizing Morocco: Transnational Activism and the Postcolonial State. Stanford University Press. ISBN 978-1-5036-0811-5.
