= Bennouna =

Bennouna (Arabic: بنونة) is a surname. Notable people with the surname include:

- Khnata Bennouna (born 1940), Moroccan author of novels and short stories
- Mehdi Bennouna, Moroccan nationalist, writer and journalist
- Mohamed Bennouna (born 1943), Moroccan diplomat and jurist
