= Qaid =

Title

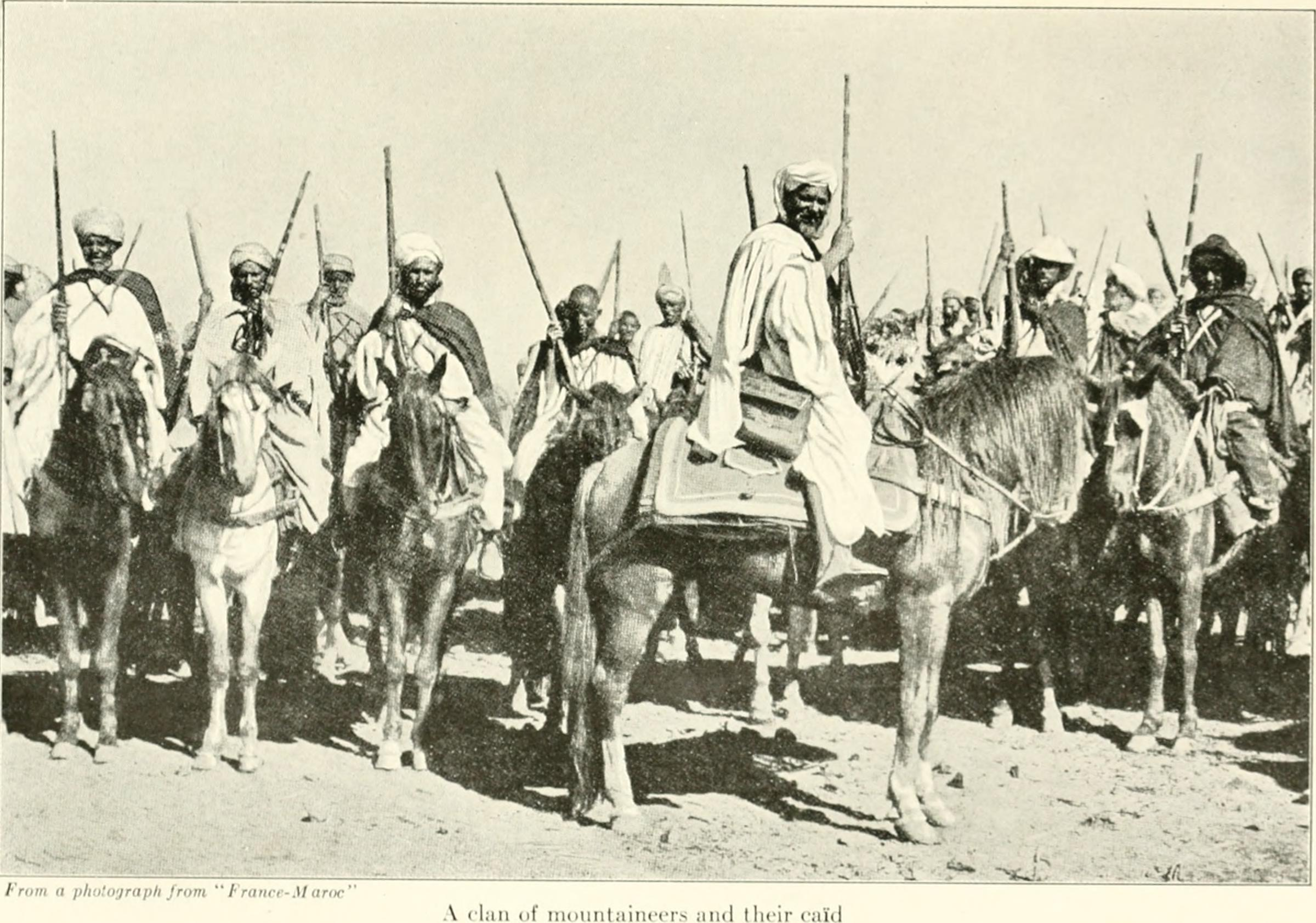
A clan of mountaineers and their qaid (In Morocco (1920) by Edith Wharton)

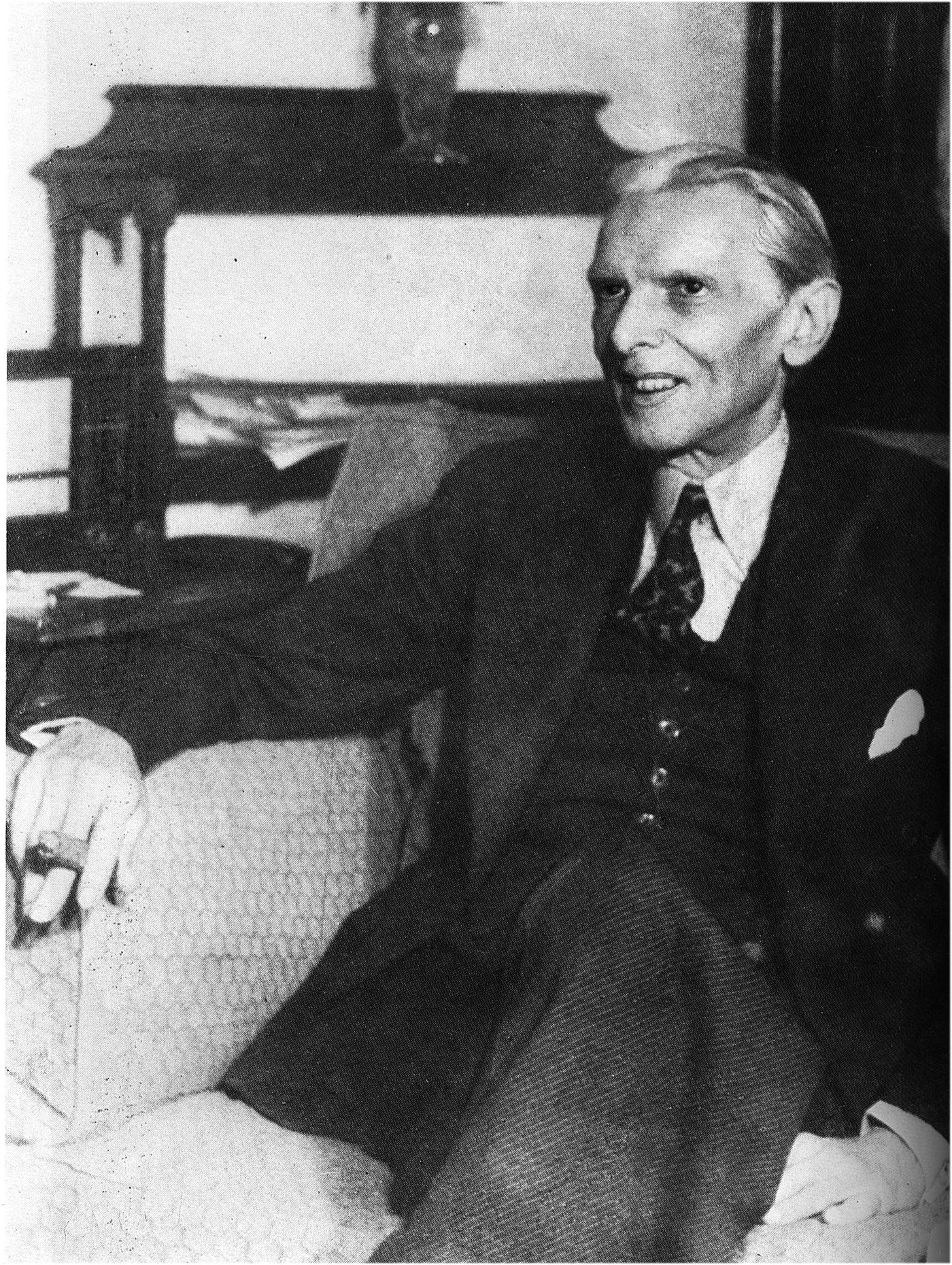
Muhammad Ali Jinnah, the founding father of Pakistan, regarded by Pakistanis as 'Quaid-e-Azam' (The Great Leader) or simply 'Quaid' (Leader)

Qaid (Arabic: قَائِد qāʾid, "commander"; pl. قَادَة qāda, or قُوَّاد quwwād), also spelled Quaid, kaid or caïd, is a word meaning "commander" or "leader." It was a title in the Norman kingdom of Sicily, applied to palatine officials and members of the curia, usually to those who were Muslims or converts to Islam. The word entered the Latin language as gaitus or gaytus. Later the word was used in North Africa for the governor of a fortress or the warden of a prison, also in Spain and Portugal in the form with the definite article "alcayde" or "alcaide". It is also used as a male Arabic given name.

== Notable qaids ==
- Al-Qaid Jawhar (active 950–992), A Slavic general who conquered the Maghreb and Egypt for the Fatimid Caliphate.
- Al-Qa'id al-Bata'ihi, chief of staff and successor of al-Afdal Shahanshah as vizier of the Fatimid Caliphate.
- Thomas Brun (active 1137–1154), Englishman who served Roger II of Sicily.
- Ahmed es-Sikeli, known as Caid Peter (active 1160s), eunuch in the court of Sicily, confidant of Margaret of Navarre.
- Richard the Qaid (died 1187), Great Chamberlain under William I of Sicily and Margaret of Navarre.
- Murat Reis the younger 17th Century Dutch renegado appointed Caid over the region including the kasbah of El-Oualidia, the port of Saffia, and Maladia (Muladie) by the Sultan of Morocco.
- Sir Harry MacLean (1848–1920), Scottish soldier, and instructor to the Moroccan Army.
- Thami El Glaoui (1879–1956), one of the Lords of the Atlas.
- Mbarek Bekkay (1907–1961), first Prime minister of Morocco, who was the qaid of Bni Drar.
- Grands caids, Berber feudal rulers of southern quarter of Morocco under the French Protectorate.
- Muhammad Ali Jinnah (1876–1948), was given the title of Quaid-Azam or "The Great Leader" as the founder of Pakistan.

== People with the given name ==
- Qaid ibn Hammad (1028–1045), ruler of Algeria
- Kaid, nickname of Andrew Belton, (1882–1970), British Army officer active in Morocco
- Kaïd Ahmed (1921–1978), Algerian nationalist and politician
- Béji Caïd Essebsi (1926–2019), Elected Tunisian president
- Al-Qaid Joher Izz al-Din (1942), Indian Islamic Leader
- Kaid Mohamed (born 1984), Welsh footballer
- Qaid Farhan Al-Qadi, Israeli Bedouin kidnapped during the October 7 attacks

== Alcaide as surname ==
- Anselmo Pardo Alcaide (1913–1977), Spanish entomologist.
- Chris Alcaide (1922–2004) American actor
- Carmen Alcayde (born 1973), Spanish TV presenter and actress
- David Alcaide (born 1978), Spanish pool player
- Guillermo Alcaide (born 1986), Spanish tennis player
- Ana Alcaide (born 1976), Spanish musician

== Places ==
- Draâ El-Kaïd, town in Algeria
- Alcaide, Fundão, town in Portugal

== Other uses ==
- Alkaid or Elkeid, traditional name of Arabic origin for star Eta Ursae Majoris
- USS Alkaid (AK-114), U.S. Navy ship named after the star
- Qaid (film), 1975 Hindi film starring Leena Chandavarkar and Kamini Kaushal
- Umar Qaid, 1975 Hindi Bollywood action film
- The Kingdom of Caid, Society for Creative Anachronism, encompasses Southern California, the Las Vegas metropolitan area, and Hawaii.
- Khuddamul Ahmadiyya chapter leaders are called Qaid. The Qaid in this terminology is a Muslim youth leader who guides his local khuddam in services to faith and nation.
- In the game Tom Clancy's Rainbow Six Siege, an operator has the name 'Kaid', with the ability to electrify defenses with his unique gadget.
- In the 1965 science fiction novel Dune, a 'Caid' is a Sardaukar officer assigned to deal with civilians.
