= Mehdi Bennouna =

Moroccan journalist

- Born: Tétouan (Maroc)
- Died: Rabat (Maroc)
- Known for: Founder of MAP (1959)
- Father: Abdelsalam Bennouna

Mehdi Bennouna was a Moroccan nationalist, writer and journalist. He was the founder of the Maghreb Arab Press Agency in 1959 and the first Moroccan delegate at the United Nations.

Emerging as the PNR's leading media expert, Bennouna played a significant role in the nationalist movement by leveraging media and public relations to advance the cause of Moroccan independence. His skills in media engagement were vital for the movement's visibility and impact in the U.S.

== Early life ==
Mehdi Bennouna was born in Tetouan, Morocco. His father was Hajj Abdelsalam Bennouna , the legendary "father of Moroccan nationalism". He left Morocco for Nablus in Palestine at the age of eleven, without his parents, and began high school in 1929 at the Najah School.

After a year in Morocco in 1936, he traveled in 1937 to Cairo. There he enrolled in medicine, which he did not pursue, instead he later obtained a degree in journalism in 1941. During his years in Egypt, Bennouna had become a student leader. He was one of the few Anglophone Moroccans of his time and took courses at the American University of Cairo.

== Career ==
He worked at the newspaper Al Ahram until he could return to Morocco at the end of the Second World War in 1944. In 1937, he participated in the constitution of the Almagreb Al Aqsa Defense Committee.

In 1944, he became a teacher at the Free Institute of Tetouan. He participated in the founding of the Workers' Union affiliated to the Party of National Reform (PRN). He was elected to its Central Committee. Before Bennouna returned to the Spanish zone in 1945, he worked as a freelance journalist, editing the PNR's official newspaper. He appeared to be the PNR's largest media expert.

In Tetouan in 1953, he directed the newspaper Al Oumma, organ of the PRN. Upon independence in 1956 he joined the Press Service of the Royal Cabinet of Mohammed V, including the preparation of the President's trip to New York in 1957. He launched Maghreb Arab Press (MAP) in 1959, a private agency that continued until 1975. It was nationalized in 1973. Between 1958 and 1962, he assisted in the creation of Tunisian (TAP), Libyan (JANA), Senegalese (APS), Malian (APA) and Algerian (APS) press agencies, and supervised the launch of the French news agency. (AIIC) of the Organization of the Islamic Conference in 1973–74.

=== Political career ===
In spite of the fact that Bennouna was not a diplomat by education, due to his outstanding intellectual capabilities and networking skills he became the first Moroccan representative in the United Nations. His nationalist credentials and familiarity with the workings of the mass media made him the ideal choice for the task at hand. This initiative led to the establishment of the Moroccan Office of Information and Documentation in Manhattan in 1952, through which Moroccan activists sought to build a network of support for their cause in the Western Hemisphere, despite facing significant cultural and linguistic barriers. He had the appearance of a modern professional and leadership experience. The appointment of Bennouna was especially important for the Moroccan independence movement. Bennouna had some practical insights regarding the anti-colonial struggle, and was seen as an important figure inside this struggle for independence. He stressed that the Moroccan nationalist movements needed the help of the Americans, in addressing the general public to overcome the considerable cultural barrier. Bennouna did so through submitting reports to the UN secetrary general, demanding Morocco's independence, which was picked up by several newspapers. Eminent diplomats would embrace Bennouna's activities at the United Nations. Bennouna also established tight contacts with Arab media representatives in New York. After Morocco gained its independence, Bennouna was appointed as press secretary of the royal cabinet by king Mohammed V.

== Publications ==
The Spanish authorities condemned his activism abroad for national independence. Upon his return to Morocco in 1948 he was prevented to enter his country, which forced him into exile. And certainly cruel on a personal level, his time in exile allowed Mehdi to write a book on the history of European colonialism in Morocco. "Our Morocco, The Story of a Just Cause" in 1951. The goal of this work was to influence the public opinion in supporting the Moroccan struggle for self-determination, and ultimately be heard by the United Nations. The nationalist press proudly printed excerpts from "the first book written by a Moroccan writer in English about the just cause of Morocco" and announced that it would be "widely distributed in all Asian, African, European, and American countries and at the UN. The writer Rom Landau personally supported Mehdi to edit the English version of his book. His second book, Morocco .. The Critical Years, was published in 1989.

== Personal life ==
He married Khadija Slaoui on the 29th. They had four children.

He died in Rabat on March 23, 2010, and was buried in his hometown of Tetouan.

== See also ==
- Maghreb Arabe Presse
