= Ahmed Belbachir Haskouri =

Moroccan historian (1908–1962)

- Born: 1908; Marrakesh, Morocco
- Died: 1962 (aged 53–54); London
- Other names: Si Hamed Ben Baxir Escuri or Escurri Sidi Ahmed Bel Bashir Haskouri Ahmer Ben Bazir Hasqouri Ahamad BenbachirScourie Sid Ahmed Ben-El Bachil Scuri Ahmad Ben Bachir El Hascori
- Occupations: Philanthropist, Moroccan writer and historian
- Spouse: Lalla Zoubeida Raissouni (m. 1950)

Ahmed Belbachir Haskouri (1908–1962) was a member of the Royal Court of Morocco and philanthropist during the protectorate period.

His name was also transliterated as Si Hamed Ben Baxir Escuri, Escurri, Sidi Ahmed Bel Bashir Haskouri, Ahmer Ben Bazir Hasqouri, Ahamad Benbachir Scourie, Sid Ahmed Ben-El Bachil Scuri, and Ahmad Ben Bachir El Hascori.

== Early life ==
Ahmed Belbachir Haskouri was born in Marrakesh, Morocco. Belbachir was born into an aristocratic family allied to the Alaouite dynasty of Morocco along with the Khalifa (representative of the sultan in Spanish Morocco) who were both tutored by Mohammed Daoud in the Tétouan Palace, where they grew up.

== Rise to power ==
Belbachir decorated Mustafa el-Nahhas, the first secretary-general of the Arab League, for Khalifa autonomy. Shuqairi, the undersecretary of the Arab League, personally visited Belbachir to reinforce Spanish Morocco in the Arab League. Belbachir awarded a medal to Shuqairi. Belbachir's tenure was during the second khalifate, a period that starts two years after the death of the first Khalifa in 1923 in Spanish Morocco. During the period from 1923 to 1925, a regent was playing the role of the Khalifa. Upon the recommendation of a few potentates, such as Ben Azouz, the second son of the first caliph seized the throne.

Belbachir held the positions of the Chief of Staff of the caliph, Chief of the Civil Household, Director General of the Secretariat of the caliph, Secretary General of the Privy Council of the Khalifa and Secretary General of the Makhzen. American writers Dmitri Kessel and Paul Bowles described him as "advisor to the Khalifa". In November 1949, La Ofensiva, a Spanish newspaper, referred to him as the chamberlain, receiving top officials of Franco's government in celebration of the Khalifa's throne day.

During World War II, he used the Spanish government to thwart the Nazis by offering visas and passports from Spanish Morocco to the Jews.

== Political ideologies ==
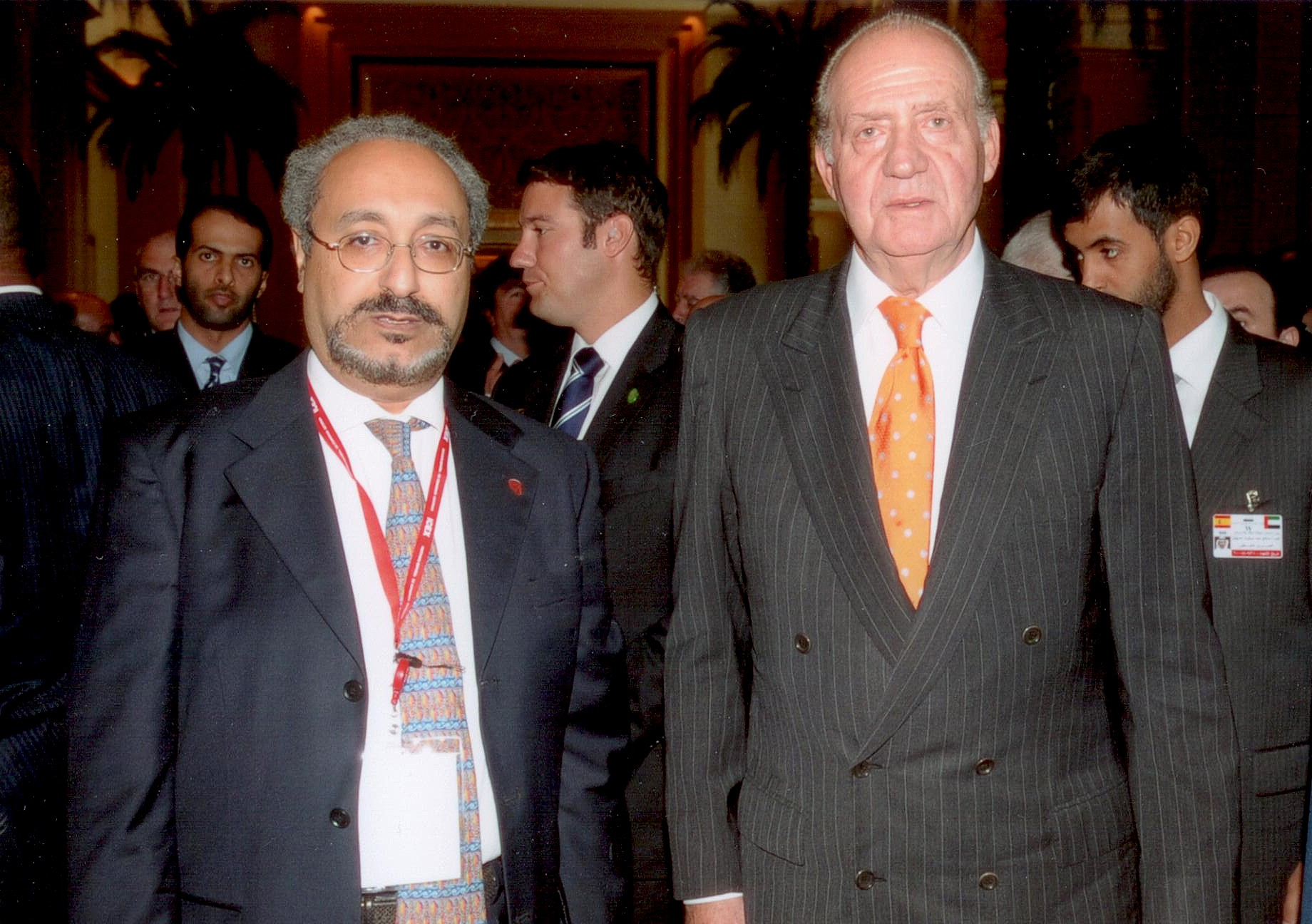
Bachir, Ahmed Belbachir Haskouri's oldest son with Juan Carlos I of Spain in 2008

Belbachir was anti-Nazi, anti-communist, and pro-monarchist with progressive views. Belbachir was often alluded to as the "Éminence grise" of the caliph of Spanish Morocco, as conveyed in 1988 by a Moroccan historian, Abdelmajid Benjelloun. Jean Wolf, a Belgian historian, further supported the term "Éminence grise" in 1994.

He was the intermediary between the Sultan Mohammed V in French Morocco and the caliph of Spanish Morocco. He was also the only negotiator between Franco and the caliph, as reported by the Spanish newspaper ABC, especially by 1956. Belbachir dissented on record in the name of the caliph; the caliph's name went down on record to that effect.

== Later life ==
Later, he married Lalla Zoubeida Raissouni in 1950. Sadiq was also former finance minister of the first Caliphal government and both cousin and previous "interlocutor" (political broker) of Mulai Ahmed er Raisuni. He was a Moroccan diplomat that was appointed by the palace rather than the Foreign Ministry to the United Kingdom. Belbachir died in London in 1962.

== Bibliography ==
- Academia de infanteria de Toledo (April 6, 1956). ABC.
- "Amama Qasr Khalifi El Amer" (In Front of the khalifal Palace) (May 1950) Al Anis p. 22.
- Benaboud Mohammed (March 1987) "Min wathiqa Maktab Al Magrib Al Arabi fi Qahira." (From the documentation of the Maghrebi Office in Cairo). Mawqif Majalat Thaqafia. p. 133.
- Benaboud Mohammed (1950). "Risalat ductur Ahmed Benaboud min Qahira ila Faqih Mohammed Afailal" (A Message from Doctor Ahmed Benaboud from Cairo to the Faki Mohammed Afailal in Tetuan). Tetuan, Morocco: Manshuwat Jumiat Tetuan Asmir.
- Bencheikh, S. (2008, August). Bey' a Enquette sur un archaisme, Telquel, 334, 38-48.
- Ben Brahim, Mohammed (1949). "Ilayka Ya Ni Ma Sadiq"(To you my dear friend). Tetuan, Morocco: Hassania Publishing Company.
- Benumaya, Gil (1940). El Jalifa en Tanger. Madrid: Instituto Jalifiano de Tetuan.
- Bonini, Emmanuel (2000). La veritable Josephine Baker. Paris: Pigmalean Gerard Watelet.
- Comida de gala en el palacio de oriente. (April 6, 1956). ABC. p. 17.
- Cushion, Steve (2009). "The Question of Moroccan independence and its effect on the Spanish Civil War". Retrieved July 14, 2009.
- Delero, M., Hakim, M. (1987). "Torres Mufti alayhi." (Torres interprets it) Tetuan, Morocco: Shuwiyakh Publishing Company.
- El Glaoui, Abdessadeq (2004). Le Ralliement. Le Glaoui Mon Père. Rabat, Morocco: Marsam Publishing Company.
- "El Alto Comisario visita el jalifa". (November 11, 1954). ABC p. 10.
- "El Jalifa en Ronda". (August 31, 1935). ABC, p. 10.
- "El Jefe de Estado recibe el Jalifa" (May 27, 1942). ABC, p 27.
- "El Jalifa viaja de regreso a Marruecos" (January 1952). ABC, p. 15.
- "Etudes D'histoire Marocain" (1987). Revue dar Niaba. P.1–10
- Hafez, Sabry (2003). "Mohammed Shoukri". Retrieved Jan 1, 2009.
- Goda, Norman J.W. (1996). Seidel, Carlos Collado Seidel, "Zufluchtsstatte fur Nationalsozialisten? Spanien, die Alliierten und die Behandlung deutscher Agenten 1944-1947". Main, U.S: H-Net.
- Kessel, Dimitri (June 20, 1949). A Sultan's Daughter Weds a Caliph. Life Magazine, p. 23.
- Les partisans de ben youssef proclameraient un regent (January 1954). La Tribune De Geneve.
- Llega El Jalifa Al Campamento (March 1941). Espana. P.2.
- Llega a Madrid la Esposa del Jalifa (March 24, 1956). ABC p. 8.
- Llegada del Jalifa a Madrid (May 26, 1942). ABC p. 15.
- Martinez-Mena, Miguel (March 31, 1955). Alicante Eleccion de la "Ballea del Foc". La Vanguardia Española, p. 8.
- Masmoudi, Hassan (December 9, 1953). "Jamia Alarabia wal Maghrib" (The Arab Organization and the Maghreb). Al Ma'rifa, p. 1.
- "Mawqif Shamal El Maghrib Min Itidad Ala El Arsh" (The position of Northern Morocco concerning the throne) (February 1953). Muasasat AbdelKhalaq Torres. P. 107.
- Mesfioui, Mohammed (1949). "Ilayka Ya Ni Ma Sadiq"(To you my dear friend). Tetuan, Morocco: Hassania Publishing Company.
- "Min Khalifa Marrakesh Ila Mu'tamar Maghreb El Arabi." (From the khalifa of the king of Morocco to the Conference of the Maghreb). (April 1947). El Ahram.
- "Rais Diwan Madani Khalifi Amama Microfone Bi Munasabat Id Zafaf Khalifi" (The Chief of the khalifal Cabinet on the microphone for the celebration of the khalifal wedding) (June 1949). Al Marifa. P. 7-8.
- Satloff, Robert (2006). Among the Righteous Lost Stories from the Holocaust's Long Reach into Arab Lands. New York: Public Affairs, member of Perseus Books Group.
- Seidel, Carlos Collado (1995). Zufluchtsstatte fur Nationalsozialisten? Spanien, die Alliierten und die Behandlung deutscher Agenten 1944-1947, Vierteljahrshefte fur Zeitgeschic.
- "The Amazing Franco". (February 1, 1954). Time. Retrieved July 12, 2009.
