= Edward Berenson =

Cultural historian, author, and academic

- Occupations: Cultural historian, author and academic

Academic background
- Education: AB., Sociology; Diploma., French Language and Civilization; PhD., History
- Alma mater: Princeton University; University of Paris; University of Rochester

Edward Berenson is a cultural historian, author, and academic. He is a professor of history and director of the Institute of French Studies at New York University.

Berenson is most known for his work on the history of modern France and its empire, along with the histories of Britain, the British Empire, and the United States. His publications comprise journal articles and nine books including Heroes of Empire: Five Charismatic Men and the Conquest of Africa and The Trial of Madame Caillaux. He has been honored with the Eugene Asher Distinguished Teaching Award from the American Historical Association in 1999, and was named Chevalier dans l'Ordre du Mérit by former French president Jacques Chirac in 2006.

== Education ==
Berenson earned an AB in Sociology from Princeton University in 1971 followed by a diploma in French language and civilization from the University of Paris in 1973 and a PhD in history from the University of Rochester in 1981.

== Career ==
Berenson began his academic career at the University of California, Los Angeles, initially as an assistant professor of history from 1980 to 1985, becoming associate professor in 1985 and professor in 1990. In 1998, he joined New York University and has been serving as a professor of history and French studies since then. During this time, his involvement has extended to administrative positions, including as the director of the Center for International Research in Humanities and Social Science from 2008 to 2012 and the chair of the Department of History from 2019 to 2021. He was appointed director of the Institute of French Studies at New York University from 2000 to 2017 and assumed the position again in 2024.

Berenson was co-president of the Society for French Historical Studies from 2003 to 2004 and a senior fellow of the National September 11 Memorial and Museum from 2015 to 2019. He has also delivered public lectures at institutions such as the French embassy, Pennsylvania State University, Houston Holocaust Museum, and the Tenement Museum. In addition, he has appeared on The Colbert Report and in television documentaries on the Statue of Liberty, written opinion articles for The New York Times, USA Today, and other publications, and he comments in French media on American politics and public life.

== Works ==
Berenson's research centers on cultural history. His first book, Populist Religion and Left-Wing Politics (1984), explored how Montagnard democratic-socialist ideals resonated in rural France, and Sandra Horvath-Peterson described it as "well written, well organized, and informative." His work on French culture and society continued with The Trial of Madame Caillaux, recounting Henriette Caillaux's murder trial to explore themes of gender roles, media influence, and honor in early 20th-century France. This book earned praise from Herbert Mitgang for its detailed research and narrative. In The French Republic: History, Values, Debates, co-edited with Vincent Duclert and Christophe Prochasson, he provided an overview of French republicanism's evolution and impact, with Emile Chabal noting that "some of the contributions are veritable masterclasses of synthesis." Previously, in 2010, he co-edited (with Eva Giloi) another volume, Constructing Charisma: Fame, Celebrity and Power in 19th-Century Europe, examining the role of 19th-century media innovations in creating celebrity culture. This work was regarded as "a lively collection, with invaluable insights for scholars working on celebrity and celebrity culture" by Patricia Tilburg.

Berenson then shifted to imperialism and national identity in modern Europe, with a focus on Britain and France, publishing in 2010, Heroes of Empire: Five Charismatic Men and the Conquest of Africa. The book analyzed how figures like Henry Morton Stanley and Pierre Savorgnan de Brazza became imperial heroes in Britain and France. Raymond Jonas called it "a fascinating book." Building upon this, he published the textbook Europe in the Modern World: A New Narrative History Since 1500 in 2016, presenting an overview of European history since 1500 that highlighted key individuals, socio-political change, and major events. He updated it to a 2nd edition in 2020.

Turning to American cultural history, Berenson authored The Statue of Liberty: A Transatlantic Story, tracing its transatlantic influences and evolving symbolism in American culture. Sam Roberts remarked, "If you think you know all there is to know about the Statue of Liberty, you'll be pleasantly surprised by Edward Berenson's The Statue of Liberty: A Transatlantic Story.” His recent book, The Accusation: Blood Libel in an American Town (2019), examined the 1928 blood libel in Massena, New York, to uncover the existence of this antisemitic myth in America. Judith Shulevitz reflected, "Berenson's book reminds us that what seems inconceivable is nonetheless possible."

== Awards and honors ==
- 1991 – Distinguished Teaching Award, University of California, Los Angeles
- 1999 – Eugene Asher Distinguished Teaching Award, American Historical Association
- 2006 – Chevalier dans l’Ordre du Mérit, President Jacques Chirac

== Bibliography ==
=== Books ===
- Populist Religion and Left-Wing Politics (1984) ISBN 978-0691053967
- The Trial of Madame Caillaux (1992) ISBN 978-0520084285
- Heroes of Empire: Five Charismatic Men and the Conquest of Africa (2010) ISBN 978-0520234277
- Constructing Charisma: Fame, Celebrity and Power in 19th-Century Europe (2010) ISBN 978-1845456948
- The French Republic: History, Values, Debates (2011) ISBN 978-0801477843
- The Statue of Liberty: A Transatlantic Story (2012) ISBN 978-0300149500
- Europe in the Modern World: A New Narrative History Since 1500 (2016) ISBN 978-0199840809
- The Accusation: Blood Libel in an American Town (2019) ISBN 978-0393249422
- Perfect Communities: Levitt, Levittown, and the Dream of White Suburbia (2025) ISBN 978-0300259544

=== Selected articles ===
- Berenson, E. (1988). The Politics of Divorce in France of the Belle Epoque: The Case of Joseph and Henriette Caillaux. The American Historical Review, 93(1), 31-55.
- Berenson, E. (1995). A permanent revolution: The historiography of 1789. Modern China, 21(1), 77-104.
- Berenson, E. (1996). The use and abuse of history. American Quarterly, 48(3), 507-515.
- Berenson, E. (2004). Making a colonial culture? Empire and the French Public, 1880-1940.
- Berenson, E. (2006). France, a political romance. In S. Gerson & L. Downs (Eds.), Why France: American historians reflect on their enduring fascination (pp. 137-150).
- Berenson, E. (2018). The politics of atrocity: The scandal in the French Congo (1905). Historia y política: Ideas, procesos y movimientos sociales, (39), 109-138.
- Berenson, E. (2020). Blood libel and the written word. Paper Brigade, 243–247.
- Berenson, E. (2022). Napoleon III: The people’s king. In E. Giloi et al. (Eds.), Staging authority: Presentation and power in nineteenth-century Europe (pp. 51-87).
