= Grands caids =

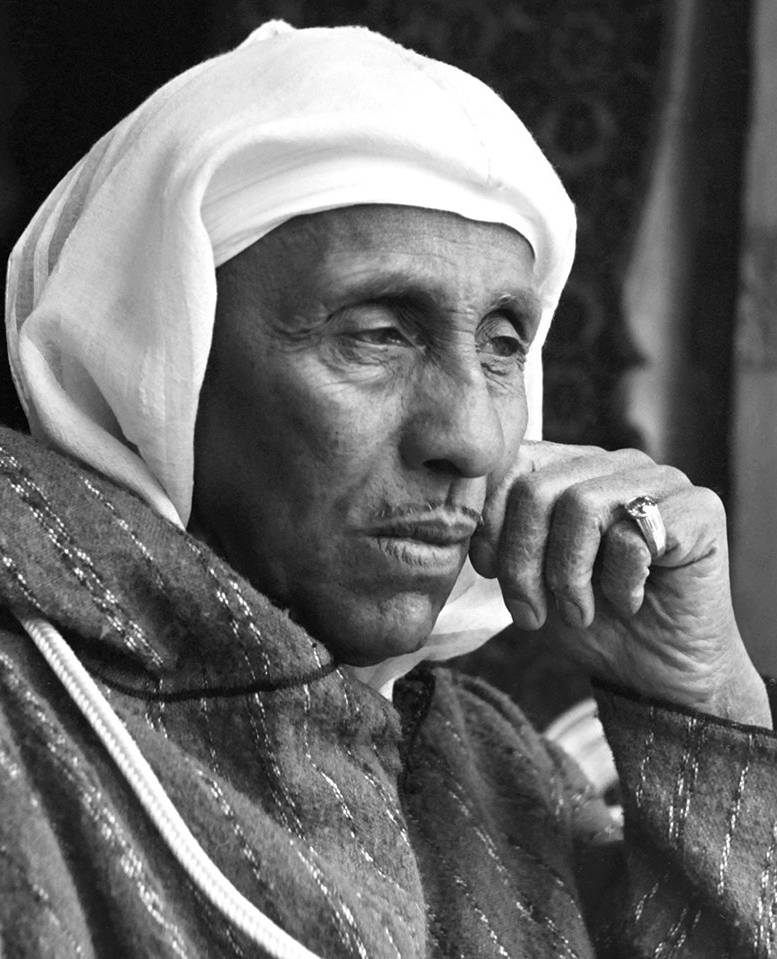
Thami El Glaoui was one of the grands caids, eventually becoming a single "super" qaid with a close relationship with the French administration

The grands caids (lit. 'great qaids') were Berber feudal rulers of southern quarter of Morocco under the French Protectorate.

== Background ==
Historically, Berber tribes, clans and further subdivisions had a council called the jemma’ which was in charge of enforcing Berber customary law called the izerf. The council was led by an amghar who had an administrative and would usually be elected yearly. However, this system was disrupted when the sultans of Morocco appointed qaids to rule over these tribes for the sultan. These appointed qaids were usually opportunists who use this opportunity to ensure their power until they surpassed the power of the jemma’. This allowed these qaids to have power to do whatever they want among their tribe whilst only being nominally loyal to the sultan. The most powerful of these became the grands caids.

== Examples ==
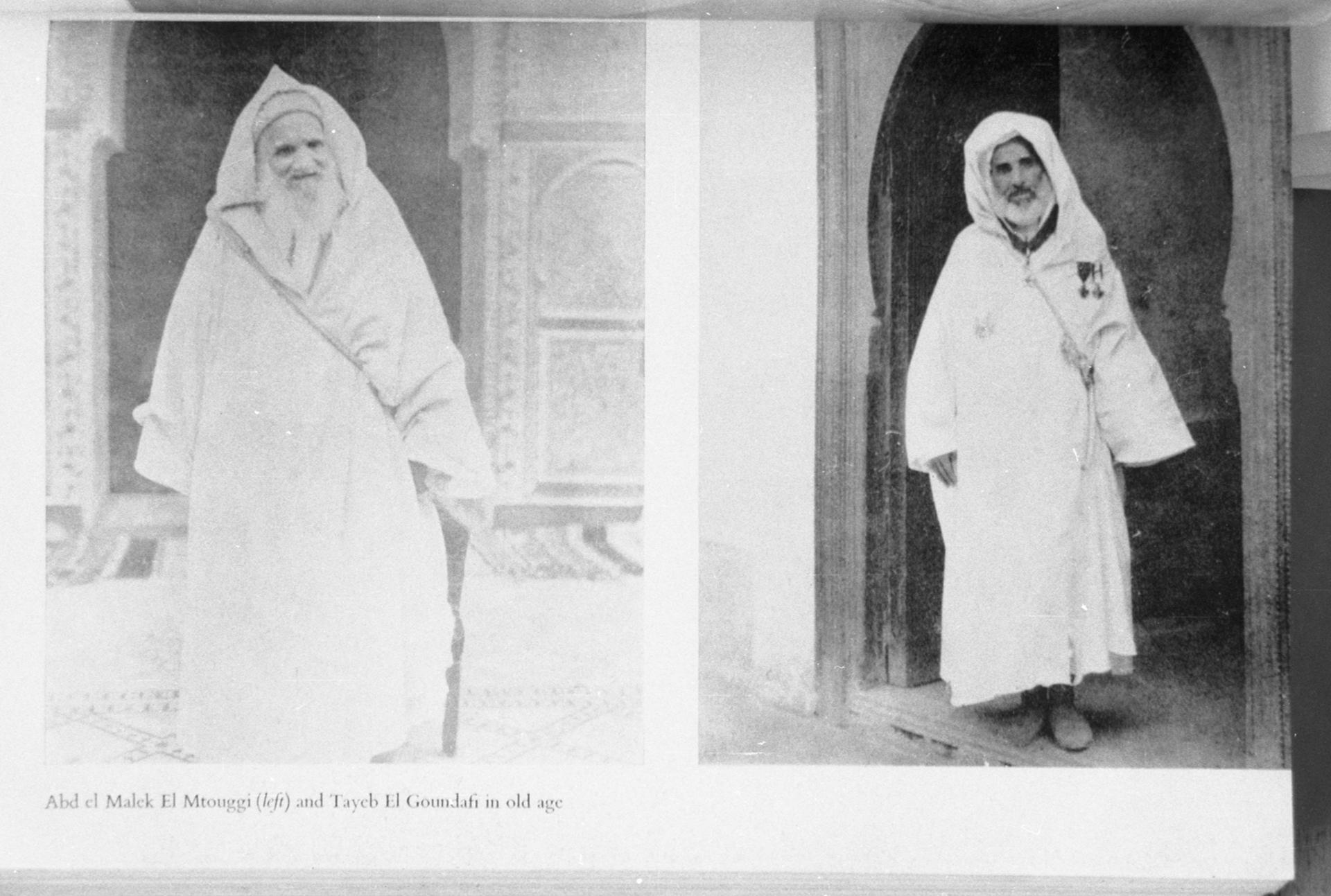
Abd al-Malik al-Mtouggi (left) and Tayyib al-Goundafi (right) in old age

The grands caids included:

- Thami El Glaoui
- Abd al-Malik al-Mtouggi
- Tayyib al-Goundafi
