= Mohammed Daoud =

- Born: 1901
- Died: 1984 (aged 82–83)

Mohammed Daoud (also Muḥammad Dāwūd) (1901-1984) was a Moroccan writer and historian. He was a major nationalist in northern Morocco during its struggle for independence from occupation by Spanish forces.

== Life ==
Daoud tutored both the caliph (representative of the sultan in Spanish Morocco) Muley Hassan ben el Mehdi and Ahmed Belbachir Haskouri in Tetouan's palace where they both grew up.

In 1923, Daoud became the head of a secondary school founded by El Haj Abdesselam Bennouna. He was also a prominent member of the Human Rights League in Tetouan and the Hispano-Muslim Association.

Along with Abdesalam Bennouna, Daoud formed the group al Muslihun (the Reformers) in 1926.
