= Mohammed al-Makki al-Nasiri =

- محمد المكي الناصري
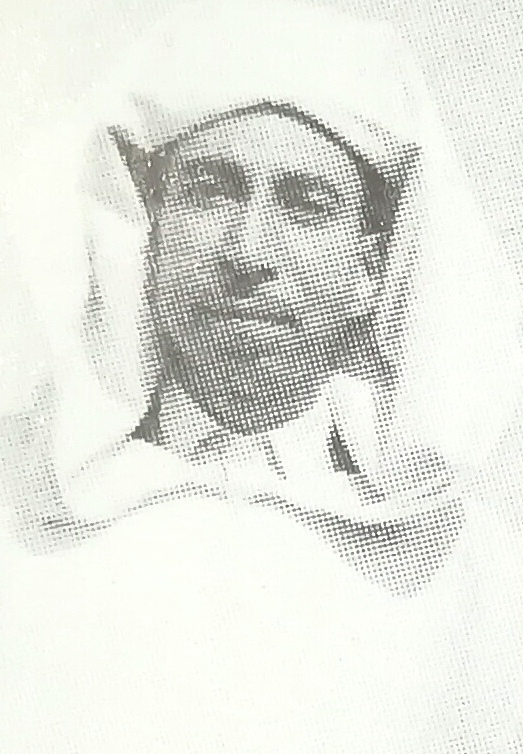
- Born: 1906; Morocco
- Died: 1994 (aged 87–88); Morocco
- Occupations: religious scholar, politician
- Notable work: Al-Taisir fi Ahadith al-Tafsir (six volumes)
- Political party: Hizb al-Wahda al-Magribiyya (The Party of Moroccan Unity)

Mohammed al-Makki al-Nasiri (Arabic: محمد المكي الناصري; 1906–1994) was a Moroccan religious scholar and nationalist politician active in the 1930s and 1940s. He was a member of the "Comité d'action marocaine" in 1934 and the founder of the "Hizb al-Wahda al-Magribiyya" (The Party of Moroccan Unity) in 1937, after a split with the faction of Abdelkhalek Torres who went to found al-Islah (Reform) Party. Mohammed al-Makki al-Nasiri was a member of the royal academy and a personal friend of Mohammed al-Mokhtar Soussi. He was the author of the six volume Al-Taisir fi Ahadith al-Tafsir.
