= Abdesalam Bennuna =

- عبد السلام بنونة
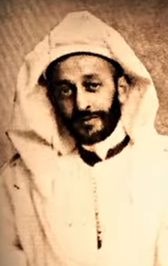
- Born: 16 February 1888; Tétouan, Morocco
- Died: January 9, 1935 (aged 46); Ronda, Spain

Abdesalam Bennuna (Arabic: عبد السلام بنونة) was a Moroccan man of letters. He is described as the "father of Moroccan nationalism."

He cofounded al-Hurriya (الحرية Freedom), an arabophone newspaper, with Abdelkhalek Torres.

He corresponded with Shakib Arslan.

Drawing inspiration from the Alliance Israélite Universelle and the school it established in Tetuan in 1862, he contacted scholars, faqīhs, and literary figures in Morocco and established the Moroccan Scientific Society (المجمع العلمي المغربي) on December 30, 1916.

Along with Mohammed Daoud, Bennouna formed the group al Muslihun (the Reformers) in 1926.

During Spanish rule of Morocco, Bennouna called for democratic reforms for Moroccans. Initially, Bennouna did not demand independence or autonomy, but reforms of colonial rule such as elected municipal councils, a general council, press freedoms, freedom of association, improved educational system, Moroccan access to administrative posts and anti-poverty measures.
