= Marvine Howe =

American journalist

Marvine Henrietta Howe
- Born: December 3, 1928 (age 97); Shanghai
- Occupation: Journalist
- Parent(s): Mary Scott (West) Howe and James Lewis Howe, Jr. (American citizens)
- Writing career
- Genre: non-fiction
- Subject: politics

Marvine Henrietta Howe (born December 3, 1928) is an American political writer and retired newspaper reporter. She was a correspondent for The New York Times.

== Life ==
Howe was born in Shanghai, China, where her father was teaching chemistry at what was called Hangzhou Christian College. Japanese incursions and the rise of the Communists forced the family to leave China. Upon returning to America, her father worked as a laboratory chemist in Philadelphia during the Depression.

Howe majored in Journalism at Rutgers University. She then attended Columbia University's School for Far Eastern Studies.

== Journalism career ==
- From 1951 to 1955 she was a news broadcaster for Radio Maroc in Rabat.
- From 1952 to 1955 she worked for British Broadcasting Corporation.
- From 1958 to 1962 she worked for McGraw-Hill World News (1945-1988) in Morocco.
- From 1956 to 1965 she was a Stringer for Time Life in Algiers, Rabat and Lisbon.
- From 1957 to 1971 she was a correspondent for The New York Times in Algiers, Rabat and Lisbon.
- From 1972 to 1975 she was bureau chief of The New York Times in Rio de Janeiro.
- From 1975 to 1976 she was a correspondent for The New York Times in Portugal and Angola.
- From 1977 to 1984 she was bureau chief of The New York Times in Beirut, Ankara, and Athens.
- From 1984 to 1994 she was a reporter of the Metropolitan in New York City.
- Since 1995 she is a Freelance writer.

== Academic career ==
- From 1950 to 1951 she was a Lecturer in a Lycee in Fez, Morocco.
- In 1959 she was a Lecturer in the University Center, Virginia.
- In 1991 she was a lecturer at Rutgers School of Communication and Information.
- In 1986 she was a delegate to the International Women's Media Conference, Washington.
