= Moroccan Plan of Reforms =

French copy of the Plan of Moroccan Reforms

The Plan of Moroccan Reforms (Arabic: برنامج الإصلاحات المغربية, French: Plan de réformes marocaines) or the Demands of the Moroccan People (وثيقة مطالب الشعب المغربي) was list of administrative, economic, and social reforms in favor the Moroccan people that the Moroccan Nationalist Movement, through the Moroccan Action Committee, demanded from the authorities of the French protectorate on 1 December 1934. Allal al-Fassi and other Moroccan nationalist leaders presented this document to the French Residence-general in Rabat, to Sultan Muhammad V in Casablanca, and to the French Foreign Minister Pierre Laval in Paris.

== Reforms ==
The document contained the following reforms:

- Administrative policy: establishment of an administrative system based on what appeared in the Treaty of Fes (1912), abolishment of direct rule, formation of a Moroccan government, and establishment of the freedom of expression
- Economic and financial policy: an end to economic exploitation, equality in taxes between Moroccans and foreigners, creation of agricultural cooperatives, protection of traditional industries from competition, nationalization of railways and energy sources
- Social policy: attention to education, particularly elementary education; attention to health, like modernizing clinics and hospitals; improvement of working conditions for Moroccans, such as limiting the workday to 8 hours

The document was divided into 15 sections:

- Political reforms
- Personal and general liberties
- Moroccan citizenship and civil status
- Equality reforms
- Social reforms
- Islamic affairs
- Public health and social care
- Labor affairs
- Economic and financial reforms
- Real estate system
- Taxes and bills
- Miscellaneous reforms
- Arabic as the official language of the country
- Moroccan flag and official holidays
- Legislation

There was no response from the French authorities to these demands; in 1937, the French authorities imprisoned or exiled a number of nationalist leaders.
