= French cruiser Galilée =

Protected cruiser of the French Navy

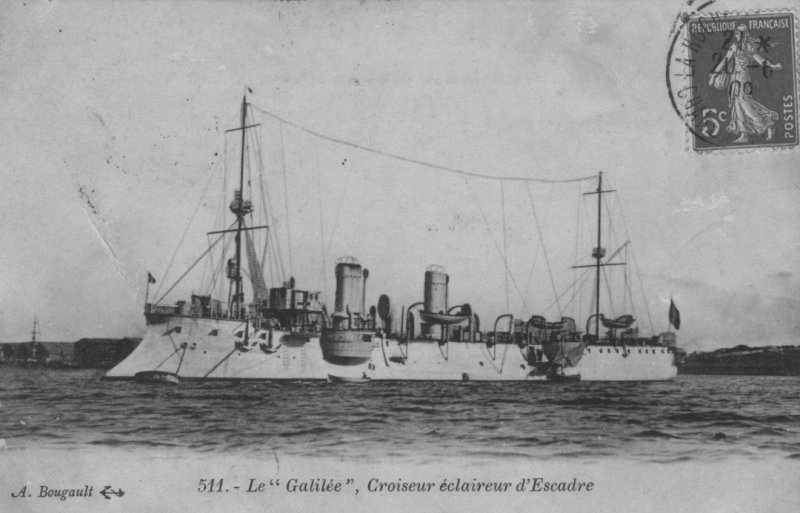
- Galilée at anchor sometime before 1909

History

France
- Name: Galilée
- Builder: Arsenal de Rochefort
- Laid down: 1893
- Launched: 28 April 1896
- Completed: September 1897
- Stricken: 1911
- Fate: Broken up

General characteristics
- Class & type: Linois-class cruiser
- Displacement: 2,285 to 2,318 long tons (2,322 to 2,355 t)
- Length: 100.63 m (330 ft 2 in) loa
- Beam: 10.97 m (36 ft)
- Draft: 5.44 m (17 ft 10 in)
- Installed power: 16 × water-tube boilers; 6,800 indicated horsepower (5,100 kW)
- Propulsion: 2 × triple-expansion steam engines; 2 × screw propellers
- Speed: 20.5 knots (38.0 km/h; 23.6 mph)
- Range: 3,000 nmi (5,600 km; 3,500 mi) at 10 knots (19 km/h; 12 mph)
- Complement: 250–269
- Armament: 4 × 138.6 mm (5.5 in) guns; 2 × 100 mm (3.9 in) guns; 8 × 47 mm (1.9 in) guns; 2 × 37 mm (1.5 in) guns; 4 × 37 mm Hotchkiss revolver cannon; 4 × 450 mm (17.7 in) torpedo tubes
- Armor: Deck: 40 mm (1.6 in); Conning tower: 138 mm (5 in)

Galilée was a protected cruiser of the French Navy built in the 1890s; she was the second member of the Linois class, which was ordered as part of a construction program directed at strengthening the fleet's cruiser force. At the time, France was concerned with the growing naval threat of the Italian and German fleets, and the new cruisers were intended to serve with the main fleet, and overseas in the French colonial empire. Galilée was armed with a main battery of four 138.6 mm (5.5 in) guns, was protected by an armor deck that was 40 mm (1.6 in) thick and she had a top speed of 20.5 knots (38.0 km/h; 23.6 mph).

Galilée served in the Mediterranean Squadron for the duration of her career, beginning in 1898. During this period, her time was spent conducting training exercises, shooting practice, and naval reviews. In 1907, she was transferred to the Reserve Division of the Mediterranean Squadron, where she continued to take part in the peacetime training schedule. In August 1907, she participated in the Bombardment of Casablanca, opening a western front to the French conquest of Morocco. She hosted President Armand Fallières and Tsar Nicholas II of Russia for a naval review during the latter's visit to France in 1909. Galilée was struck from the naval register in 1911 and subsequently broken up.

== Design ==
Plan and profile drawing of the Linois class

In response to a war scare with Italy in the late 1880s, the French Navy embarked on a major construction program in 1890 to counter the threat of the Italian fleet and that of Italy's ally Germany. The plan called for a total of seventy cruisers for use in home waters and overseas in the French colonial empire. The Linois class of protected cruisers was ordered as part of the program, and the design was based on the earlier Forbin class.

Galilée was 100.63 m (330 ft 2 in) long overall, with a beam of 10.97 m (36 ft) and a draft of 5.44 m (17 ft 10 in). She displaced 2,285 to 2,318 long tons (2,322 to 2,355 t). Her crew varied over the course of her career, amounting to 250–269 officers and enlisted men. The ship's propulsion system consisted of a pair of triple-expansion steam engines driving two screw propellers. Steam was provided by sixteen coal-burning Belleville type water-tube boilers that were ducted into two funnels. Her machinery was rated to produce 6,800 indicated horsepower (5,100 kW) for a top speed of 20.5 knots (38.0 km/h; 23.6 mph). She had a cruising radius of 3,000 nautical miles (5,600 km; 3,500 mi) at 10 knots (19 km/h; 12 mph) and 600 nmi (1,100 km; 690 mi) at 20.5 knots.

The ship was armed with a main battery of four 138.6 mm (5.5 in) 45-caliber guns in individual pivot mounts, all in sponsons located amidships with two guns per broadside. These were supported by a secondary battery that consisted of a pair of 100 mm (3.9 in) guns, one at the bow and the other at the stern. For close-range defense against torpedo boats, she carried eight 47 mm (1.9 in) 3-pounder Hotchkiss guns, two 37 mm (1.5 in) guns, and four 37 mm Hotchkiss revolver cannon. She was also armed with four 450 mm (17.7 in) torpedo tubes in her hull above the waterline, and she had provisions to carry up to 120 naval mines. Armor protection consisted of a curved armor deck that was 40 mm (1.6 in) thick, along with 138 mm (5 in) plating on the conning tower.

== Service history ==
Stern view of Galilée

=== Construction – 1900 ===
The keel for Galilée was laid down at the Arsenal de Rochefort shipyard in Rochefort in 1893. She was launched on 28 April 1896 and she was completed in September 1897. She completed her sea trials off Rochefort that year, reaching a maximum speed of 19.8 knots (36.7 km/h; 22.8 mph) in poor weather.

The next year, she was assigned to the Mediterranean Squadron, which at that time consisted of four pre-dreadnought battleships, four ironclads, two armored cruisers, and three other protected cruisers, among other smaller vessels. On 20 September 1898, the ship took part in shooting practice with the battleships Jauréguiberry, Brennus, and Charles Martel, the ironclad Magenta, and the armored cruiser Chanzy; the ships used the old ironclad floating battery Arrogante as a target; they fired some 350 shells at Arrogante, which caught fire, rolled over, and sank. By 1899, the unit had been strengthened with new ships, allowing older, less effective vessels to be sent elsewhere. By that time, the unit consisted of six pre-dreadnought battleships, three armored cruisers, seven other protected cruisers, and several smaller vessels in addition to Galilée.

Galilée operated with the Mediterranean Squadron in 1900, which was stationed in Toulon. On 6 March, Galilée joined several pre-dreadnought battleships and the protected cruisers Du Chayla, Lavoisier, and Cassard for maneuvers off Golfe-Juan on the Côte d'Azur, including night firing training. Over the course of April, the ships visited numerous French ports along the Mediterranean coast, and on 31 May the fleet steamed to Corsica for a visit that lasted until 8 June. She then took part in the fleet maneuvers that began later that month as part of Group II, along with Cassard and Du Chayla. The maneuvers included a blockade conducted by Group II in late June, and after completing its own exercises, the Mediterranean Squadron rendezvoused with the Northern Squadron off Lisbon, Portugal in late June before proceeding to Quiberon Bay for joint maneuvers in July. The maneuvers concluded with a naval review in Cherbourg on 19 July for President Émile Loubet. On 1 August, the Mediterranean Fleet departed for Toulon, arriving on 14 August. Eleven days later, the naval minister, the army minister, and several representatives from the French Parliament embarked on three of the squadron's battleships, and Galilée and the armored cruiser Chanzy escorted them to Corsica and French Tunisia before returning to Toulon on 22 October.

=== 1901–1907 ===
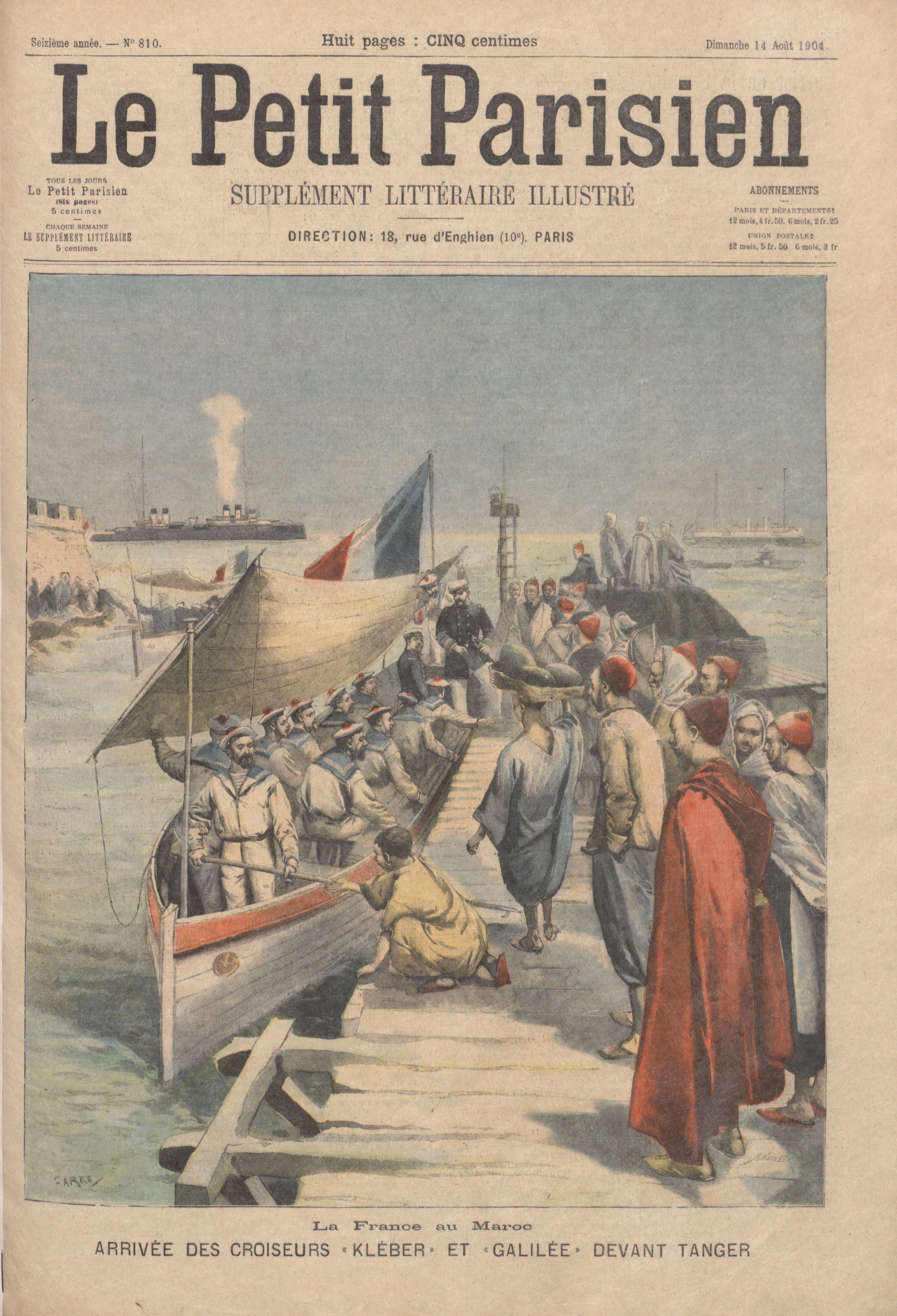
Galilée (right) along with Kléber (left) arriving in Tangier in the Perdicaris affair, as depicted on the cover of the illustrated supplement of Le Petit Parisien, 14 Aug 1904.

She remained with the Mediterranean Squadron the following year. That year, the annual fleet maneuvers were conducted from 3 to 28 July. The ship was present for the exercises, but instead of taking an active role, she escorted the battleship Bouvet, which hosted the admiral in charge of supervising the maneuvers. The ship continued to serve in the squadron through 1902. During the 1902 fleet maneuvers, which began on 7 July, the Northern Squadron attempted to force a passage through the Strait of Gibraltar. The cruisers of the Mediterranean Squadron, including Galilée, conducted patrols from their base at Mers El Kébir to observe their entrance and signal the rest of the fleet. After successfully detecting the simulated enemy squadron, they shadowed the vessels until the rest of the Mediterranean Squadron assembled, but the Northern Squadron commander was able to shake his pursuers long enough to prevent them from intercepting his force before the end of the exercises on 15 July. Further maneuvers with the combined fleet took place, concluding on 5 August.

One of the Linois-class cruisers before 1905

The ship remained in service with the squadron in 1903. Galilée got underway on 29 January with other members of the squadron for gunnery practice in Golf-Juan. The exercises were interrupted two days later by a collision between two of the battleships. In December 1903, the transport ship Vienne went missing after sailing from Rochefort, and Galilée was sent to search for the missing vessel. She searched from the coast of Spain south to Morocco and then west to the Azores without finding any trace of the ship. In the summer of 1904, Galilée arrived in Tangier along with the armored cruiser Kléber during the Perdicaris affair.

She continued to operate with the Mediterranean Squadron in 1904. She remained in service with the unit in 1905, and the following year. The ship took part in the fleet maneuvers that year, which began on 6 July with the concentration of the Northern and Mediterranean Squadrons in Algiers. The maneuvers were conducted in the western Mediterranean, alternating between ports in French North Africa and Toulon and Marseille, France, and concluding on 4 August.

She was transferred to the Reserve Division of the Mediterranean Squadron in 1907. The ship was in a nearby dry dock in Toulon when the battleship Iéna exploded on 12 March that year. Galilée was present for the 1907 fleet maneuvers, which again saw the Northern and Mediterranean Squadrons unite for large-scale operations held off the coast of Morocco and in the western Mediterranean. The exercises consisted of two phases and began on 2 July and concluded on 20 July.

=== Bombardment of Casablanca ===
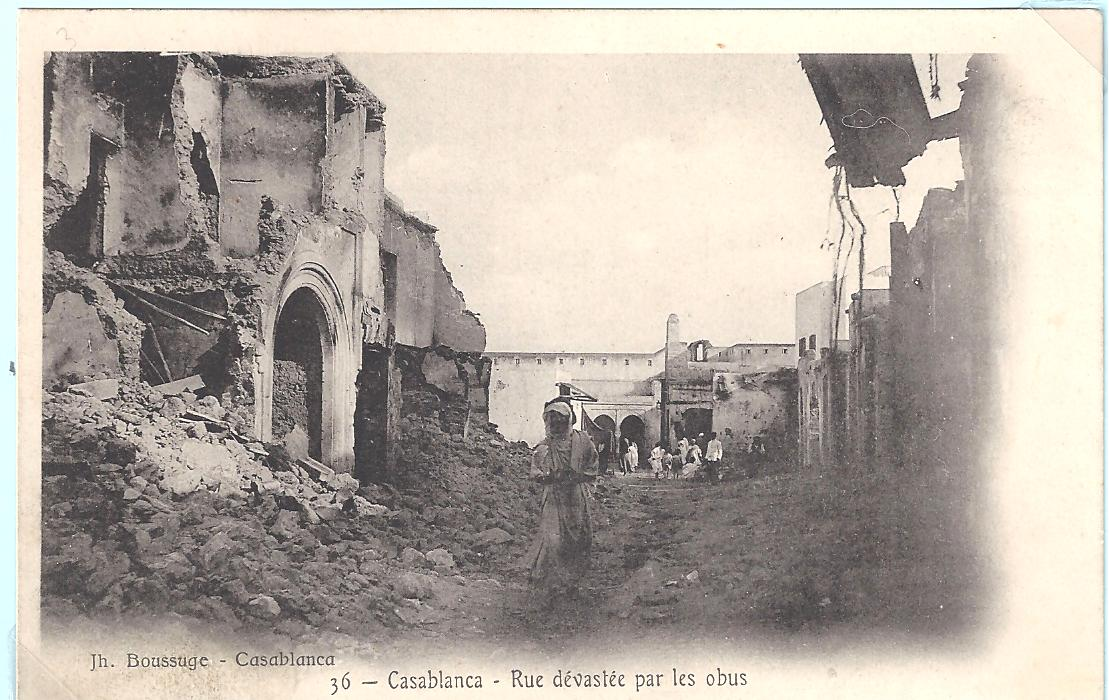
Aftermath of the Bombardment of Casablanca.

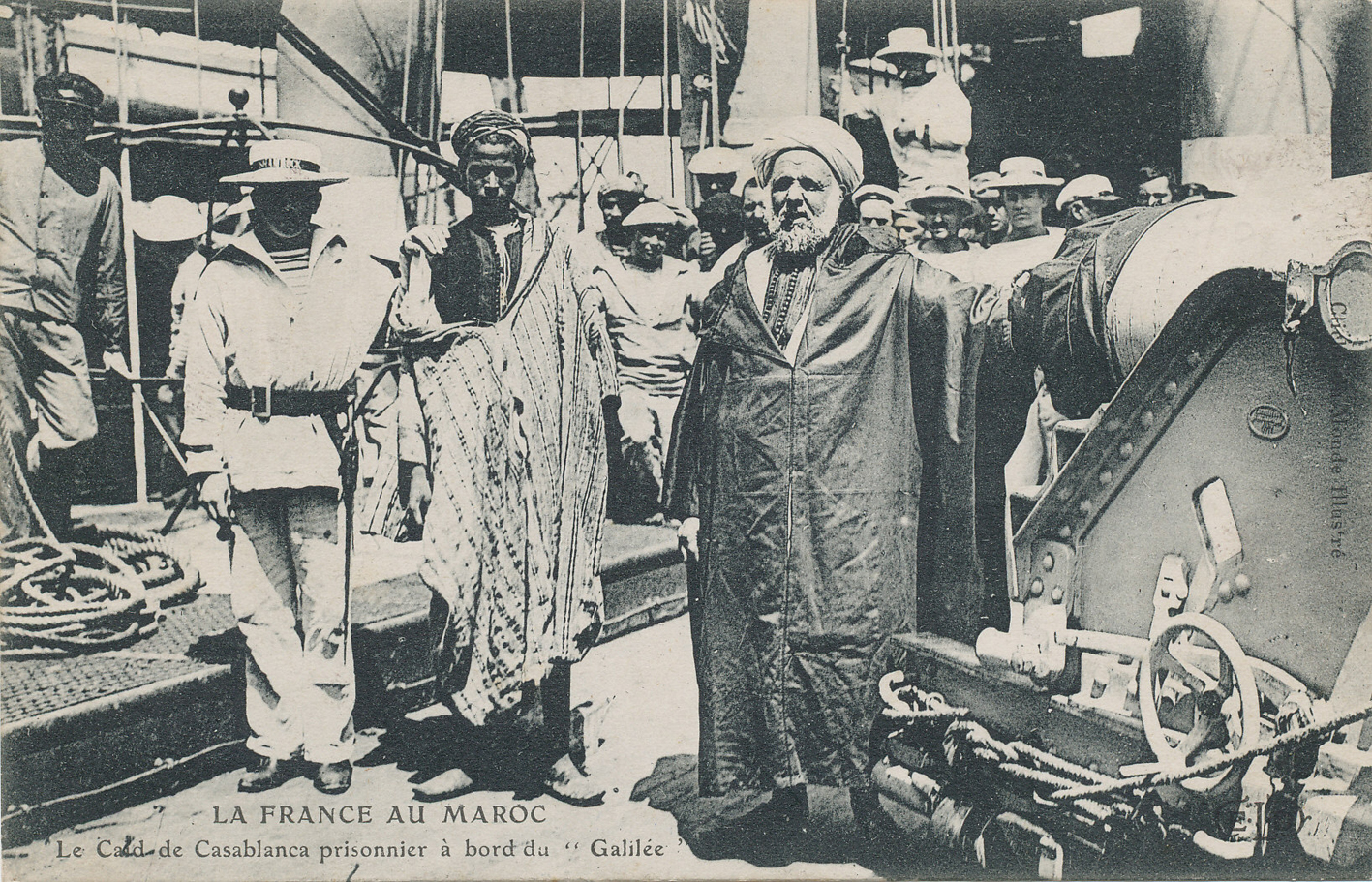
The Pacha of Casablanca, Abu Bakr Ibn Abi Zaid as-Slawi, captive aboard Galilée.

The following month, she was involved in the Bombardment of Casablanca, which marked the beginning of the French conquest of Morocco from the west. On July 30, 1907, tribesmen of the Shawiya opposing the terms of the Treaty of Algeciras and the vacillations of the representative of the Makhzen, the Qaid Abu Bakr Ibn Abi Zaid as-Slawi, killed nine European employees of la Compagnie Marocaine operating a Decauville train from a quarry in Roches Noires to the Port of Casablanca.

Galilée was dispatched the same day by order of Charles de Beaupoil, comte de Saint-Aulaire on behalf of Eugène Regnault. He instructed Commandant Ollivier of Galilée to protect the lives and possessions of the Europeans, and to bombard if necessary to protect the European settlements. Galilée arrived in the waters of Casablanca on August 1 at 8:30 am. The situation was stable until August 5, when Galilée put a landing party of 75 men ashore, into the city, causing an insurrection.

While the French colonial forces were fighting their way to the French consulate, Galilée was joined by Du Chayla, and the two cruisers then bombarded the port and the fortress in the city. Additional French forces arrived by 9 August and sent a larger force of 3,000 sailors ashore. The Moroccan resistance made a major assault on the French forces the next day, but intense fire support from the French warships drove them off with heavy losses, an estimated 6,000–15,000 Moroccan deaths.

She remained in the Reserve Division in 1908. In July 1909, Tsar Nicholas II of Russia visited France, and on the 27th, he boarded Galilée along with President Armand Fallières to observe a naval review in Cherbourg. Galilée was struck from the naval register in 1911 and was then broken up.
