= Abd al-Khaliq =

ʻAbd al-Khāliq (ALA-LC romanization of Arabic: عبد الخالق) is a Muslim male given name and, in modern usage, surname. It is built from the Arabic words ʻabd and al-Khāliq, one of the names of God in the Qur'an, which give rise to the Muslim theophoric names. It means "servant of the Creator".

It may refer to:

- Abdelkhalek Torres (1910–1970), Moroccan journalist and nationalist leader
- Abdel Khaliq Mahjub (1927–1971), Sudanese politician
- Abdul Khalek Hassouna (1898–1992), Egyptian diplomat
- Abdul Khaleque (1927–2013), first Inspector General of Bangladesh Police
- Abdul Khaliq Ghijduwani (died 1179), Central Asian Sufi teacher
- Abdel Khaliq Sarwat Pasha (1873–1928), Egyptian politician
- Abdul-Khaliq Jawad (born 1930), Iraqi weightlifter
- Abdul Khaliq (cricketer) (1896–1943), Indian cricketer
- Abdul Khaliq (athlete) (1933–1988), Pakistani sprinter
- Abdul Khaliq (footballer) (died 2007), Pakistani footballer
- Talukder Abdul Khaleque (born 1952), Bangladeshi politician and the mayor of Khulna City Corporation
- Abdul Khaleque (Assamese politician) (born 1971), Indian politician
- Asad Abdul-Khaliq (born 1980), American football player
- Abdul Khaliq Hussaini, Afghan politician
- Abdul Khaliq Masood (born 1955), former president of the Iraq Football Association
- Abdul-Khaliq Sabih (born 1991), Iraqi kickboxer
- Abdul Khaliq Abid, Afghan politician
- Mohamed Abdul Khalek Hassouna (1888–1992), Egyptian-Palestinian diplomat
- Khaliq Junejo (Abdul Khalique Junejo, born 1952), chairman of Jeay Sindh Mahaz
- Abdul Khaliq Khan Achakzai, Pakistani politician
- Abdul Khaliq Madrasi, Indian Islamic scholar
- Syed Abdul Khaliq Pirzada, Pakistani politician
- Abdul Khaliq Sambhali, Indian Islamic scholar
- Abdul Khaleque Mondal, Bangladeshi politician
- Abdul Khaleque Ahmed, Pakistani politician
- Abdul Khaleque Molla, Indian politician
- Abdul Khaleque (Brahmanbaria politician)
- Abdul Khaleque (scholar) (born 1892), social reformer, Islamic preacher, educator and philosopher
- Abdul Khaleque (footballer) (born 1911), half-back for Mohammedan Sporting

== See also ==
- Abdul Khaliq Hazara (disambiguation)
