= Antoine Drude =

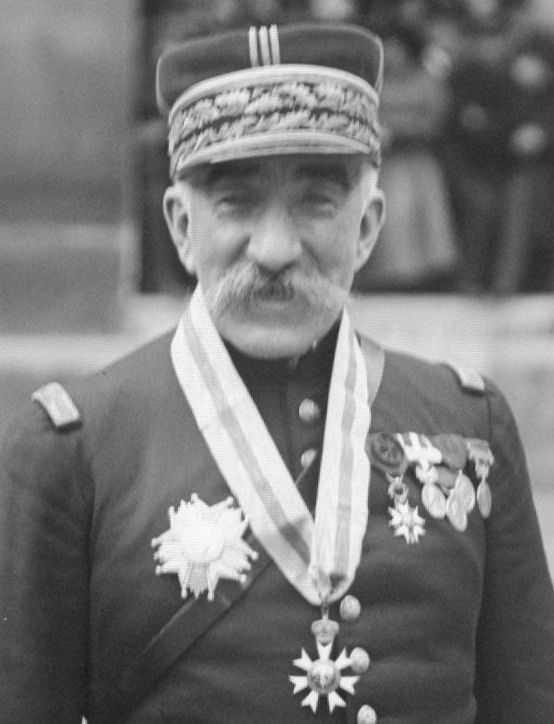
- Born: 27 May 1853 Condé, France
- Died: 7 January 1943 (aged 89) Marseille, France
- Allegiance: France
- Branch: French Army
- Rank: General
- Conflicts: Boxer Rebellion; Bombardment of Casablanca (1907)

Antoine Drude (aka Antoine Marius Benoît Drude: 27 May 1853 in Condé – 7 January 1943 in Marseille) was a French general.

He was the son of Magdeleine Honorine (née Clément) and Etienne Drude. Drude entered the French Military in 1872 and in 1892 commanded a company of the Foreign Legion in Dahomey. Between 1900 and 1901, he participated in the Boxer Rebellion in China, capturing Kao Peng on 7 November 1900, while heading three infantry companies and a field artillery section. In 1901, he became a lieutenant colonel, having participated in 14 campaigns. In 1907, he was appointed Brigadier General and commanding troops from Algeria, landed in Morocco on 7 August after the Bombardment of Casablanca. Drude was elevated to Major General in 1911 and in 1914 he became commander of the Division of Oran.

Drude was knighted on 9 July, 1892 and became a Grand Officer of the Legion of Honor in 1914.
