= Parque de la Conferencia =

Park in Southeastern Spain

Coordinates: 36°07′32″N 5°26′32″W

- Interactive map of Parque de la Conferencia
- Location: Algeciras, Spain
- Created: 2007

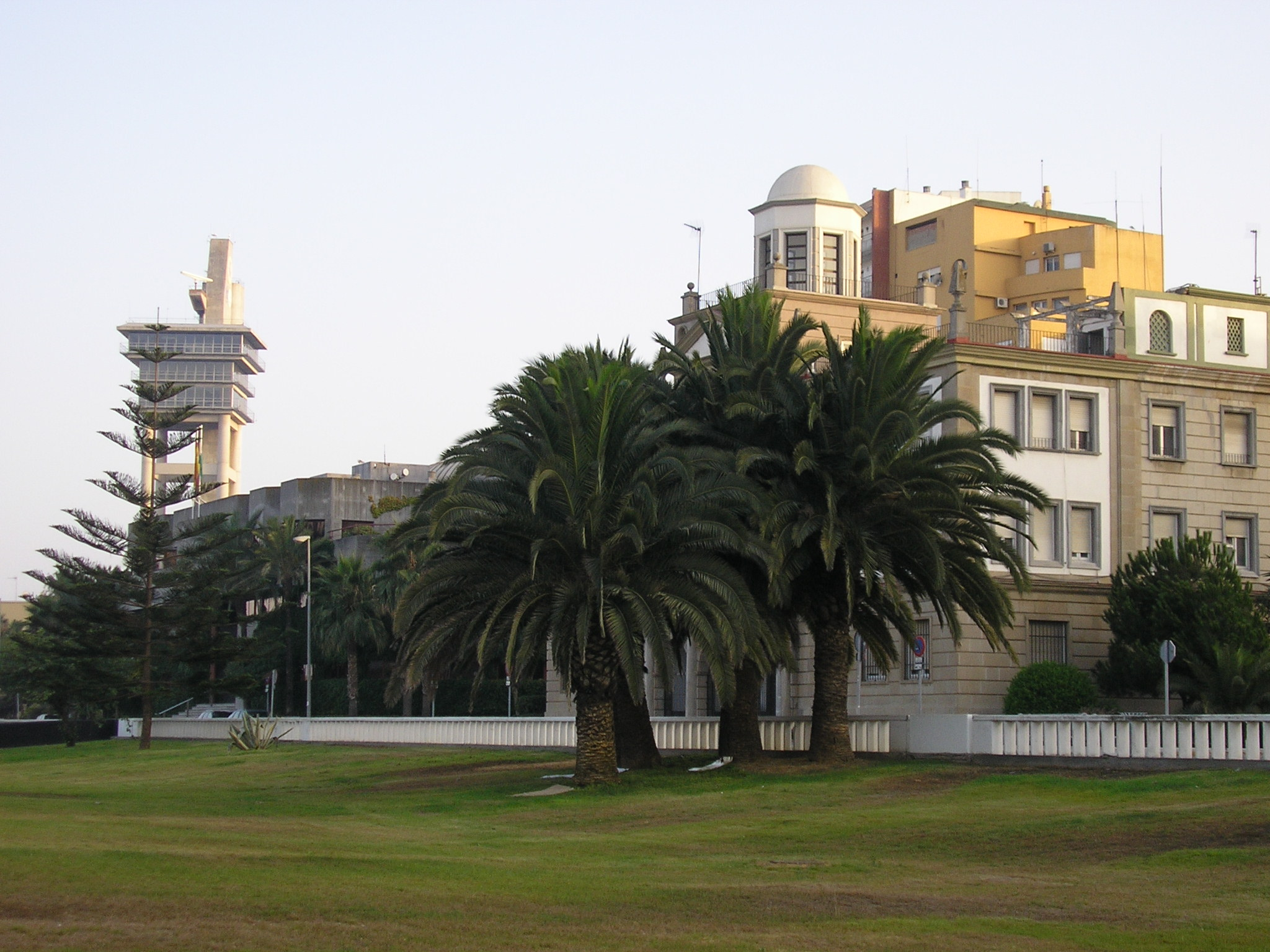

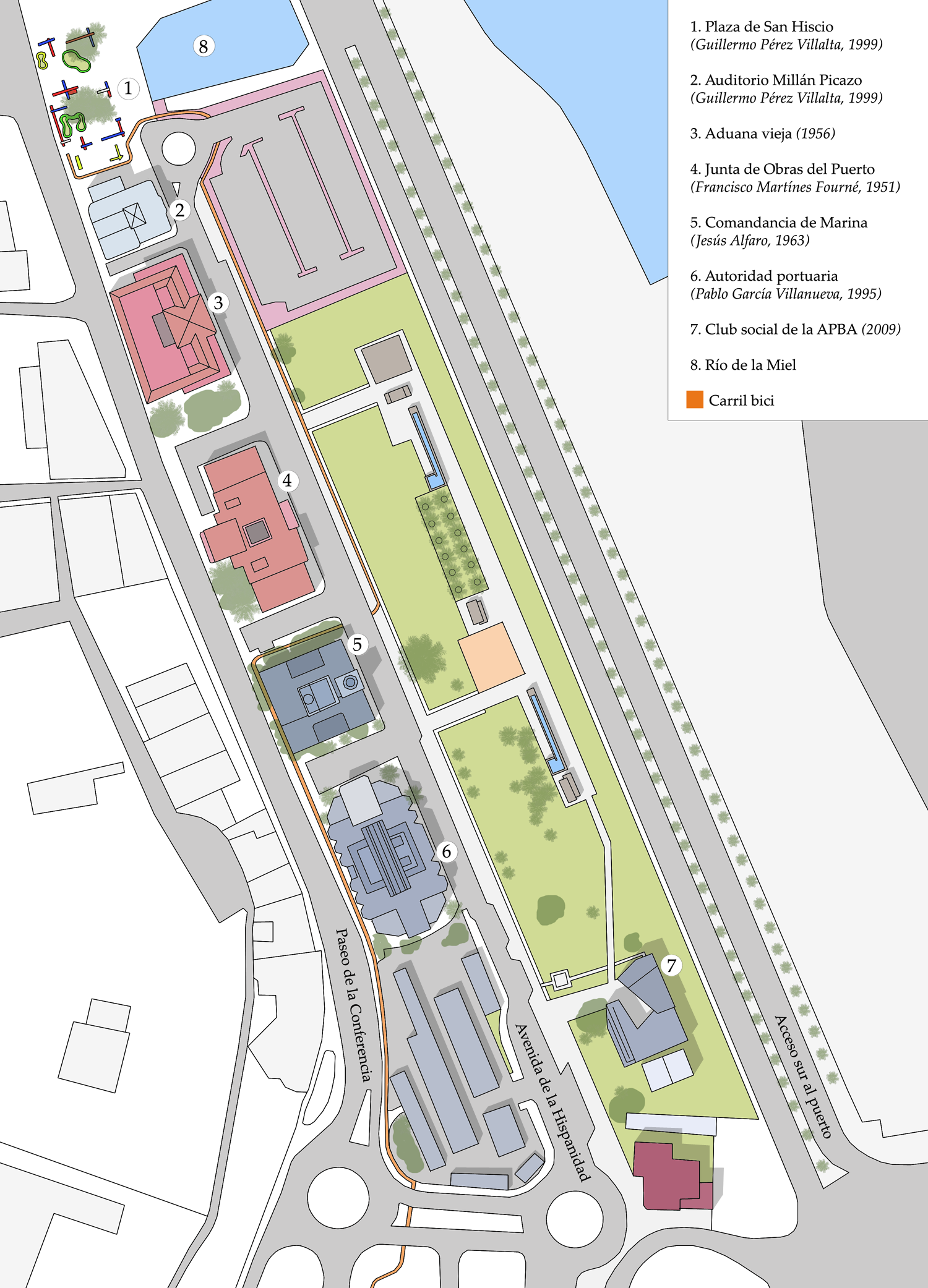
Map

Parque de la Conferencia is a park in Algeciras, southeastern Spain. Established in 2007 to mark the centenary of the Algeciras Conference. It covers an area of 9,011 square metres (96,990 sq ft) and is divided into several zones.
