= Muhammad Torres =

Moroccan diplomat

Hajj Muhammad Torres
- محمد ابن العربي الطريس
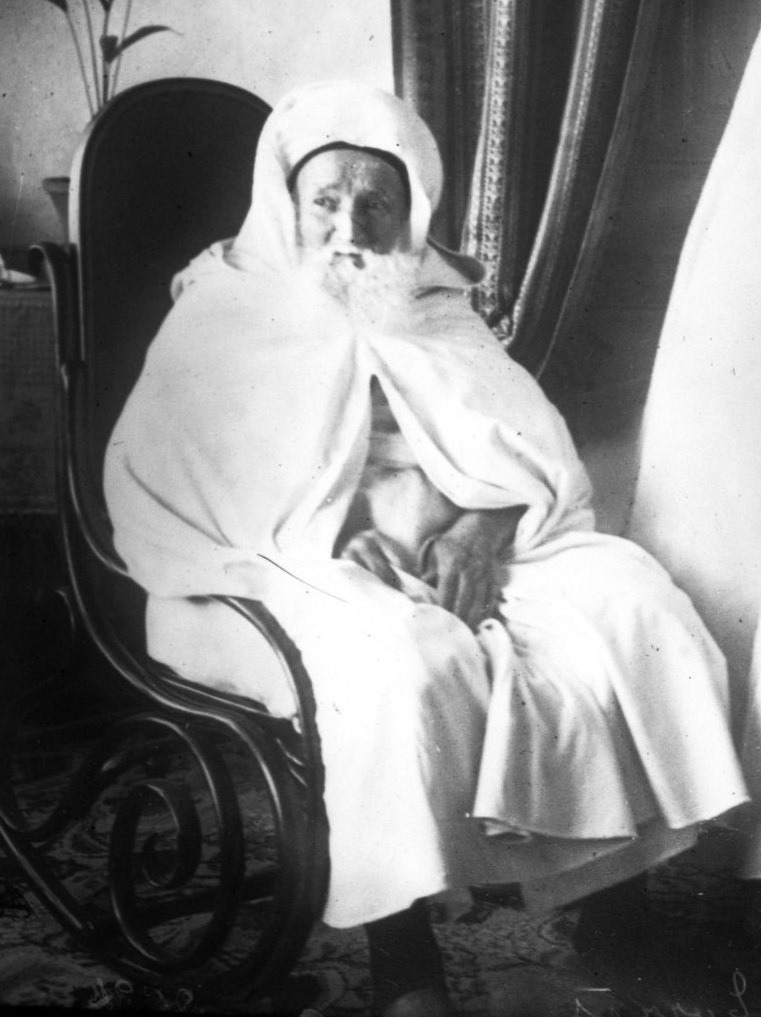
- Born: 1820.
- Died: September 13, 1908
- Occupations: Diplomat; Qaid of Marrakesh
- Relatives: Abdelkhalek Torres

Muhammad ibn al-'Arabi at-Torres (Arabic: محمد ابن العربي الطريس; approximately 1820 - September 13, 1908) was a Moroccan diplomat, representative of the sultan in Tangier, and foreign minister of Morocco at the turn of the 20th century. He was present at the 1906 Algeciras Conference, which established French preeminence among European powers in Morocco.

== Biography ==
He was qa'id of Casablanca from about 1880.

He then assumed the position of Naib or representative of the sultan in Tangier in 1883, taking over for Muhammad Bargash. The duties of this post involved interlocution between the Makhzen and the European diplomatic bodies in Tangier.

=== Envoy to the Vatican ===
Torres, sent by Sultan Hassan I to Pope Leo XIII, led the first Moroccan diplomatic mission to the Vatican in 1888.

The position temporarily became less important from the death of Hassan I in 1894 until the death of Ba Ahmed in 1900, when his role of grand vizier was more important.

=== Algeciras Conference ===
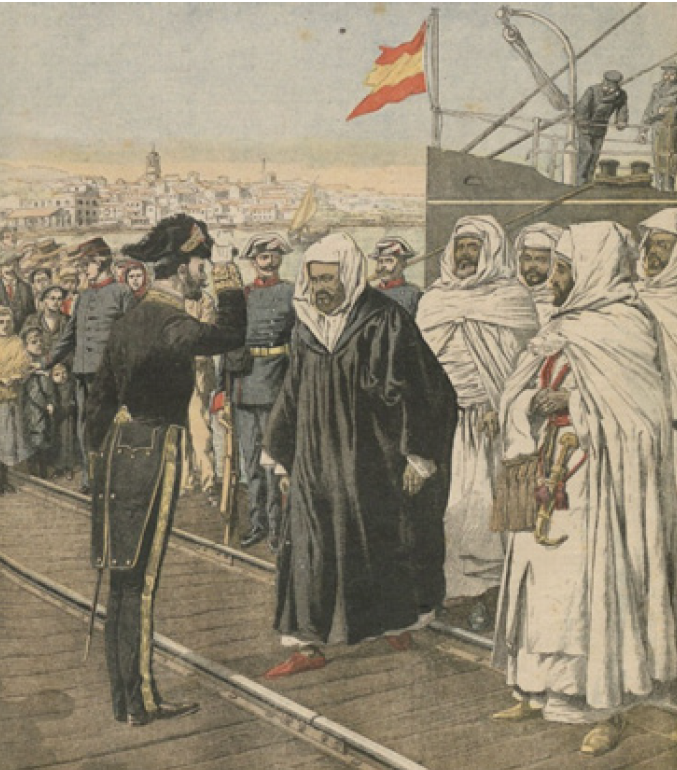
Sidi Mohammd Torres landing at Algeciras - from Le Petit Journal, 1906/01/21

He served as plenipotentiary representative of Sultan Abdelaziz at the Algeciras Conference of 1906, although Muhammad al-Muqri led the negotiations. They encountered a number of challenges at the conference, chief among which was the matter of language, as they could not understand what was being said. They had to rely on an Algerian translator who was present in the service of France: Abdelqader Ben Ghabrit.

=== Release of the Qa'id of Casablanca ===
Torres negotiated the release and return of Abu Bakr Ibn Abi Zaid as-Slawi, qa'id of Casablanca at the time of the French Bombardment of Casablanca August 1907. as-Slawi had been taken to Algeria by force in the aftermath of the bombardment and invasion of Casablanca.

Torres died in 1908, and was replaced by Muhammad al-Guebbas.

== Family ==
- Abdelkhalek Torres (1910-1970), nephew. Moroccan journalist and nationalist leader.
