= Bombardment of Casablanca =

1907 French naval attack

Coordinates: 33°32′N 7°35′W

- Part of the French conquest of Morocco
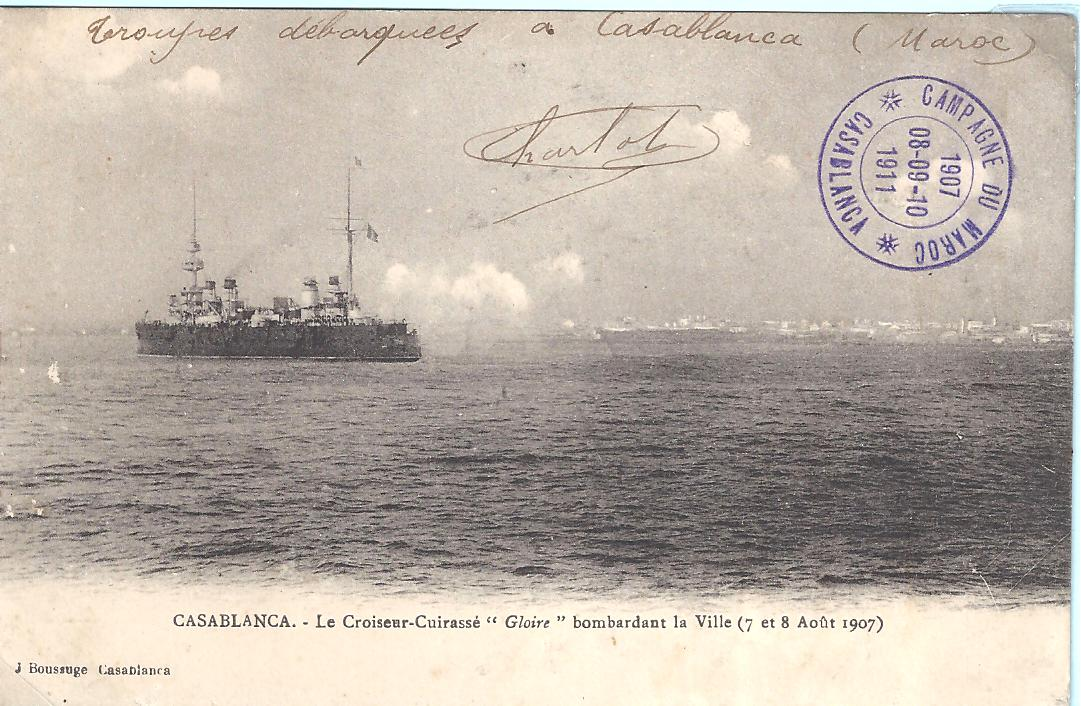
- The French cruiser Gloire bombarding Casablanca, August 1907 printed on a postcard.
Date	5–7 August 1907
Location	Casablanca, Morocco
Result	French conquest and occupation of Casablanca

Belligerents
France	Morocco

Commanders and leaders
(France) Antoine Drude (France) Joseph Philibert	(Morocco) Abd al-Aziz al-Alawi (Morocco) Abu Bakr bin Bouzid

Casualties and losses
- 1,500 to 7,000 civilian deaths

The Bombardment of Casablanca (Arabic: قصف الدار البيضاء; French: bombardement de Casablanca) was a French naval attack that took place from 5 to 7 August 1907, destroying the Moroccan city of Casablanca. France used mainly artillery fire from armored cruisers to bomb the city and targets in the surrounding area, which caused an estimated 1,500 to 7,000 Moroccan deaths. The bombardment of Casablanca opened a western front to the French conquest of Morocco after Hubert Lyautey's occupation of Oujda in the east earlier that year.

The bombardment came after an attack of tribesmen of the Shawiya opposed to the terms of the Treaty of Algeciras of 1906 to the French presence in the customs house and to the construction of a railroad over a sanctuary, specifically on European employees of the Compagnie Marocaine operating a Decauville train from a quarry in Roches Noires to the Port of Casablanca on 30 July 1907. When the French cruiser Galilée disembarked a landing party of 75 soldiers on 5 August, an insurrection broke out in the city.

The Galilée and the Du Chayla bombarded the city with mélinite, an explosive substance containing picric acid that struck residential neighborhouods, particularly the Tnaker.

== Background ==
After capturing Oujda, French forces turned their sights to Casablanca, the domain of the tribes of the Chaouia that were known for producing soldiers.

Five years before the French protectorate, Casablanca had been occupied, but the battles continued. Dozens of battles took place within the city, in the periphery and finally deeper into the Chaouia.

In 1907, the issue of French agents controlling customs duties and the start of intense, alienating and clearly-colonial construction came to a head.

On 29 July a delegation of Chaouia tribes presented itself to Moulay Lamine, the governor of the province and uncle of Morocco's young sultan, Abdelaziz El-Alawi, with the desire to demolish the works under way. Another delegation met with the city's pasha, Si Boubker Ben Bouzid Slaoui to protest and demand an end to the construction on the port, the destruction of the railroad and the removal of the French supervisors at the customs house. On 30 July the turmoil in the city increased. In the morning, a public crier sent by the Oulad Hriz tribe called the population to end all relations with the French.

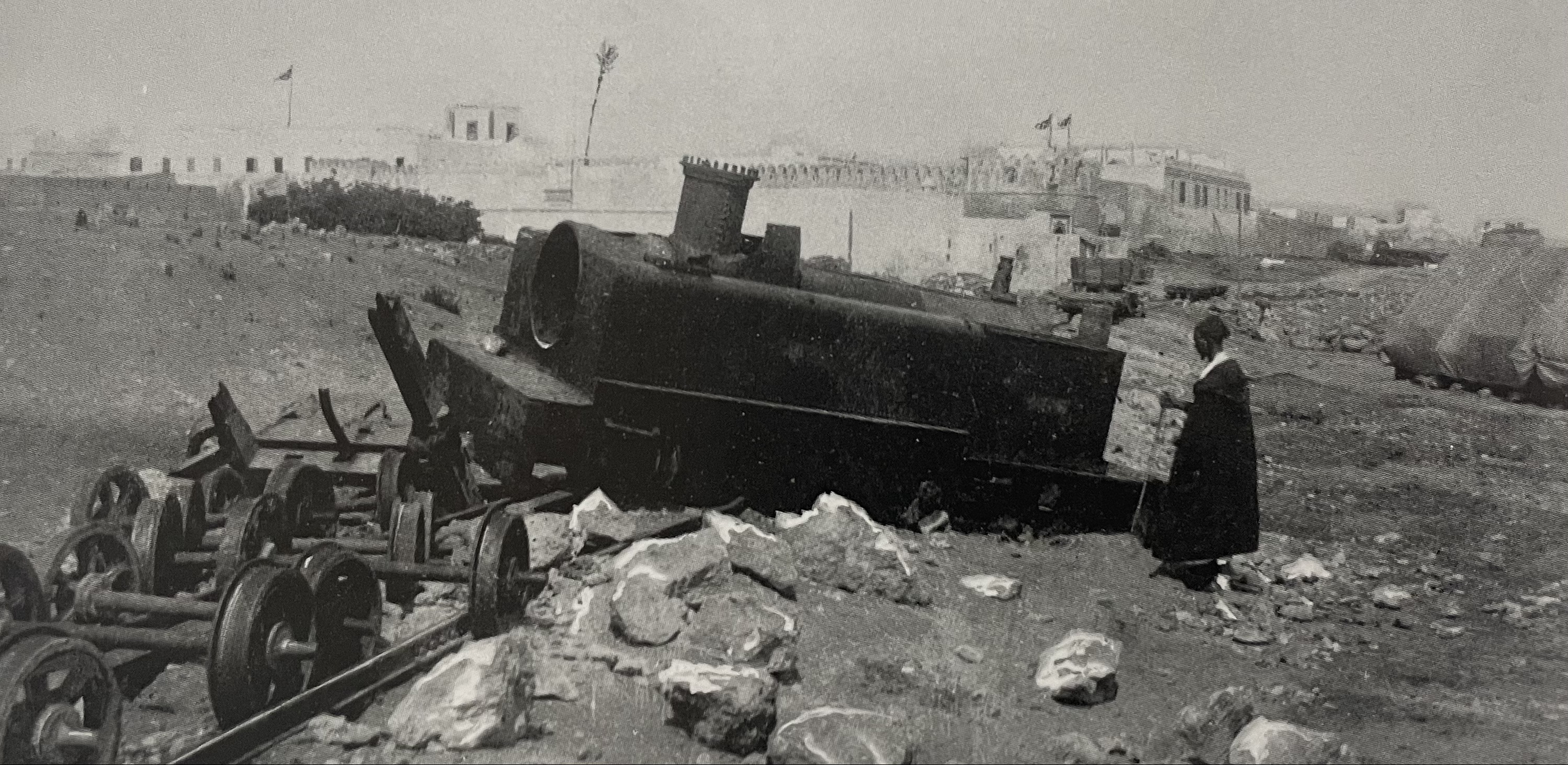
A man inspects the derailed Decauville locomotive at the scene of the attack that served as the pretext for the French bombardment of Casablanca in 1907.

Hajj Hammou, the qa'id of the Oulad Hriz tribe, called for jihad and prepared for battle with the French and the Spanish and their associates. People of the Chaouia took to the streets and violence broke out that afternoon, which led to the death of nine European labourers working for the Compagnie Marocaine, the French company that was chosen to build the port. The protesters stopped the train, the tracks of which ran over the Sidi Belyout necropolis on the way to a quarry up the shore with a pile of rocks on the track, and attacked the European workers aboard: four French, three Italian and two Spanish.

== Bombardment ==
After the insurrection of 30 July 1907, thousands of warriors from the Chaouia, apparently allied with Ma al-'Aynayn, took Casablanca. France was surprised because of poor intelligence and urgently sent for a fleet, which left from Algeria. Saint Aulaire, the diplomat in charge of the French Legation in Tangier, acted under instruction from Paris and called a number of warships to Casablanca, including the Linois-class cruiser Galilée, which was dispatched from Tangier that very night and arrived on 1 August, and the cruiser Du Chayla, which arrived on 4 August from Toulon. The morning of 5 August. 66 men disembarked from Galilée to protect the French consulate, a move that was criticised by other European powers present in Casablanca, as it aggravated the situation in the city. Foreign warships arrived on the scene, including the British cruiser HMS Antrim and the Spanish gunboat Álvaro de Bazán, which landed 30 men to protect the Spanish consulate.

The French protected cruiser Forbin arrived from the Azores. In the late afternoon, once French forces had occupied the French, Swedish and Portuguese consulates in Casablanca by entering through the Portuguese consulate, Galilée commenced bombardment. On 7 August a French squadron arrived from Algeria: Gloire, Gueydon, Dupetit-Thouars, and Condé. It was soon joined by Jeanne d'Arc, Nive, and the hospital ship Shamrock, transporting terrestrial forces.

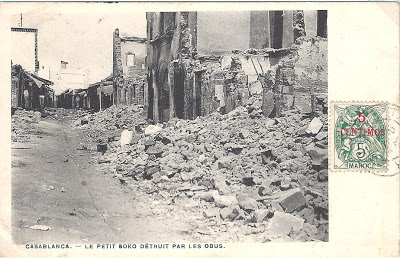
Casablanca was almost entirely destroyed by the bombardment.

Galilée and Gloire bombarded the qasbah causing numerous casualties: "rebels" and civilians alike. The working-class neighborhood Tnaker (تناكر), near the port, paid the heftiest price by taking shrapnel from shells filled with mélinite, a nitric compound that was adopted by the French government. Houses of worship, including the great mosque and the sanctuary of the Mausoleum of Allal al-Qairawani, were not spared.

The gates to the medina were especially targeted to prevent the entrance of Chaoui combatants.

The bombardment continued through the night and into the morning of 6 August, with 31 soldiers disembarking from Du Chayla and 44 from Forbin. The Moroccans, despite the considerable losses suffered from the incessant bombardment, continued to fight, which inspired unease within the French troops. The squadron of Rear-Admiral Joseph-Alphonse Philibert brought General Antoine Drude's troops, including French and Algerian tirailleurs, to shore at the beach of Sidi Belyout, where they were met with Moroccan fire.

On 7 August the disembarked troops of General Drude and the marine riflemen of Philibert, after fierce combat, retook control of the city. According to eyewitnesses and diplomatic sources, a "revolution" seemed to have started in Morocco. Some had the premonition that was only the beginning of a long war between the French and the Moroccans.

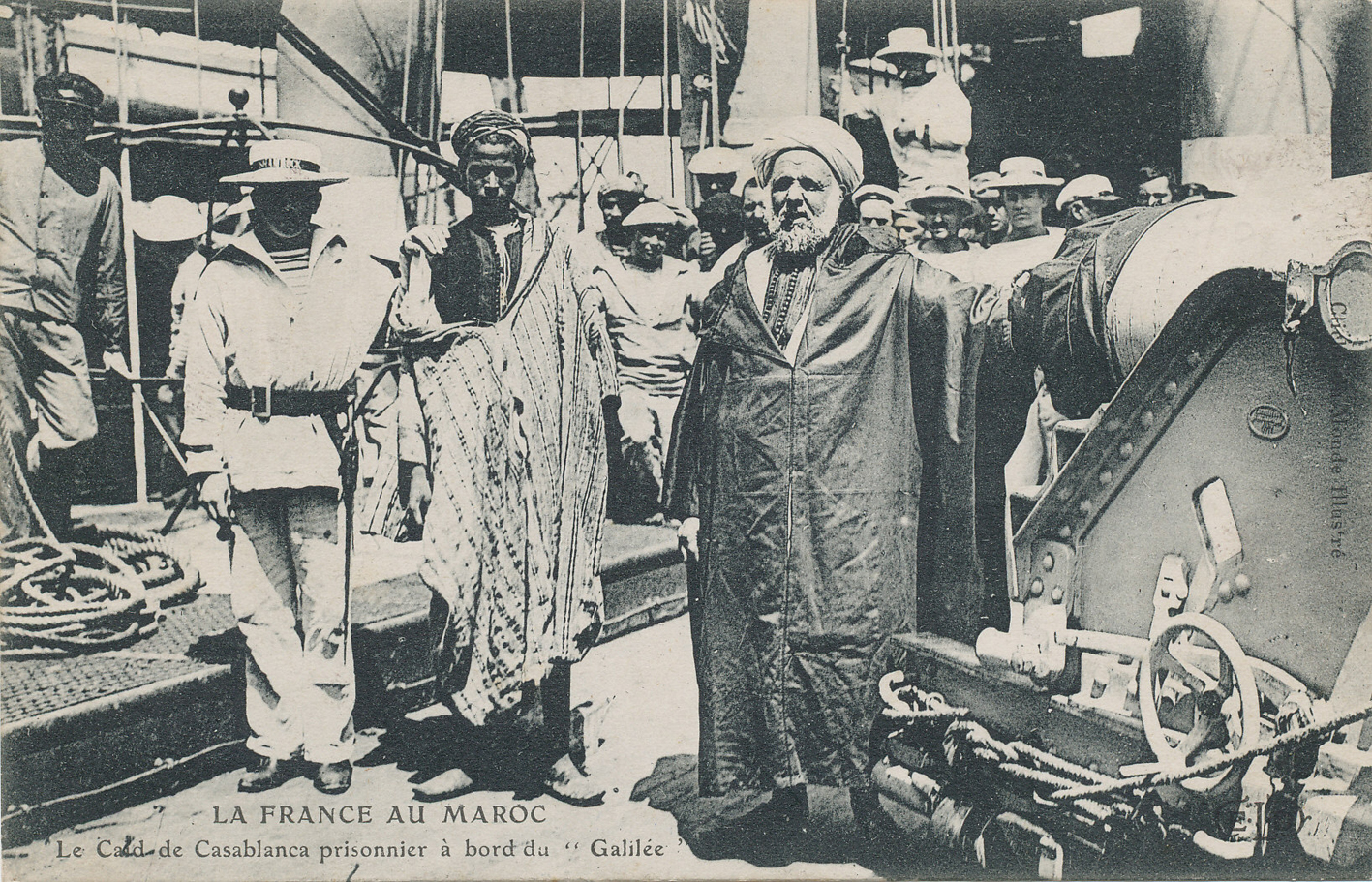
The Pacha of Casablanca, Abu Bakr Ibn Abi Zaid as-Slawi, captive on the French cruiser Galilée, which bombed Casablanca from 5–7 August 1907.

Over three days of bombs raining down from the French warships, followed by carnage and pillaging from troops on the ground, what had been a prosperous city of 30,000 inhabitants was transformed into a field of rubble with nothing spared except for the European neighbourhood.

French sources put the death toll at a conservative 600 to 1,500, but German sources estimate 2,000 to 3,000. Moroccan sources, supported by European testimonies, attest that only a few rare inhabitants of the city survived after the carnage.

The city—and particularly the Mellah, inhabited by the city's Jewish population—was pillaged after the landing of the French troops. The victims were primarily Jewish, though there were also Muslim victims. According to testimony from the director of the school of the Alliance Israélite Universelle:

From the first cannon round, the soldiers of the Makhzen advanced towards the mellah, followed by the general populace, and the looting began. The 5,000–6,000 tribesmen who had been waiting outside the gates entered the city and swept throughout the mellah as well as the medina, stealing, pillaging, raping, killing, and burning... (Note: Original French text: les soldats du Makhzen, dès le premier coup de canon, se précipitent sur le mellah, suivis de la populace, et commencent le pillage. Les 5 à 6 000 hommes des tribus, qui attendaient aux portes, pénètrent en ville, se répandent tant au mellah qu'à la médina, volent, pillent, violent, tuent, incendient...)

On 6 September the commercial ship Magnus brought the 400 Jews who had fled at the beginning of the insurrection back to Casablanca from Tangier and Gibraltar.

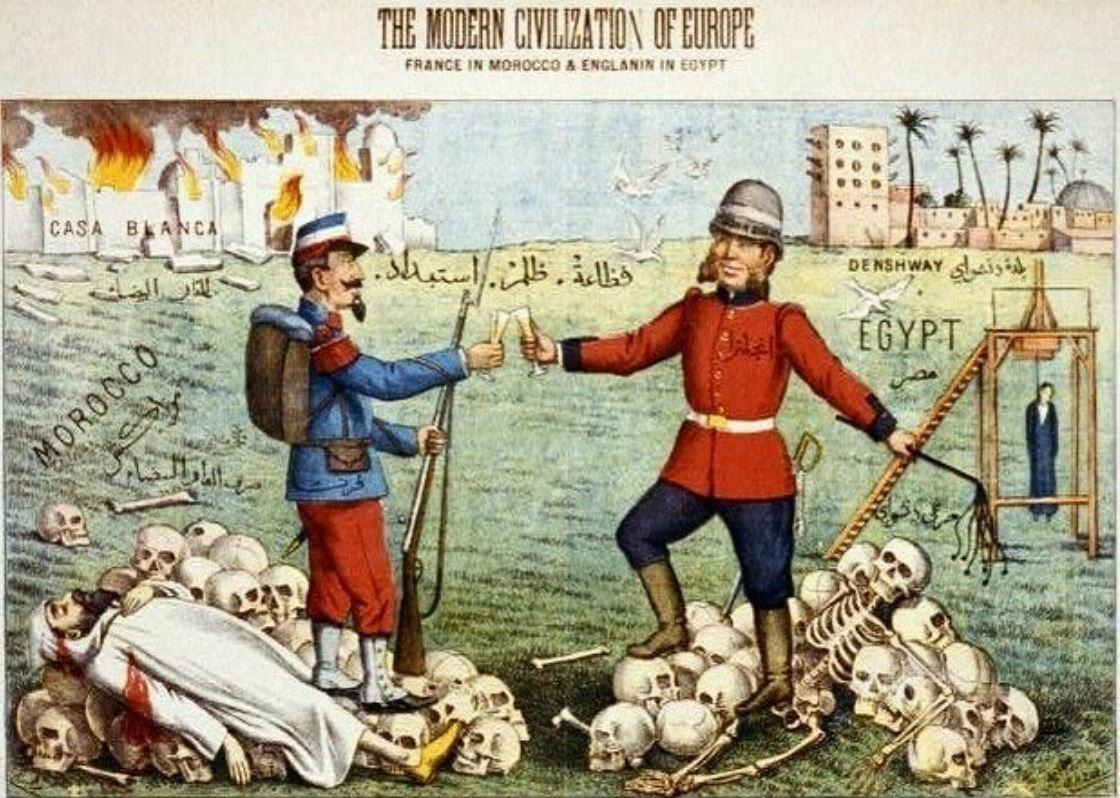
"The Modern Civilization of Europeː France in Morocco & England in Egypt," a cartoon by A.H. Zaki for Cairo Punch. The cartoon refers to the Bombardment of Casablanca and the Denshawai incident.

== Gallery ==
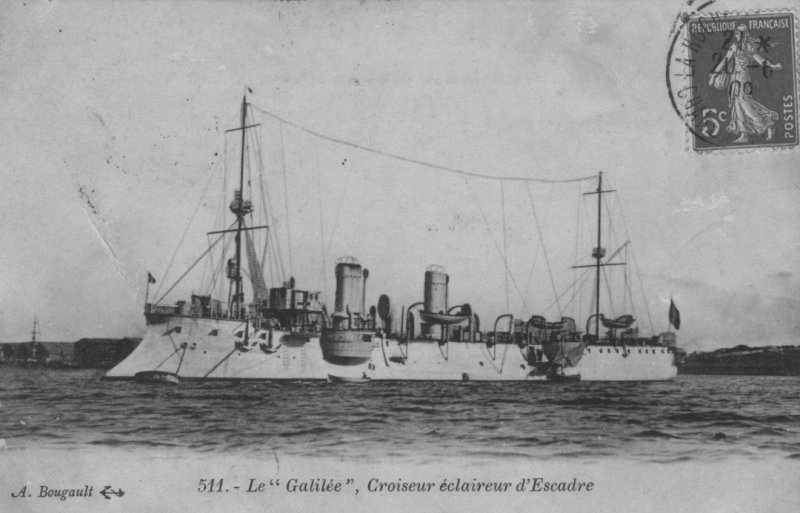
Photograph of Galilée, a Linois-class cruiser.

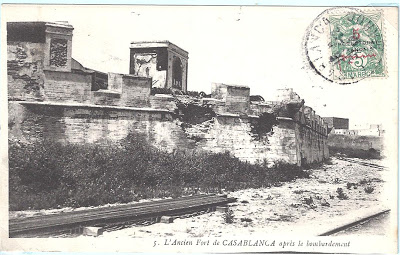
The Sqala of Casablanca after the bombardment.

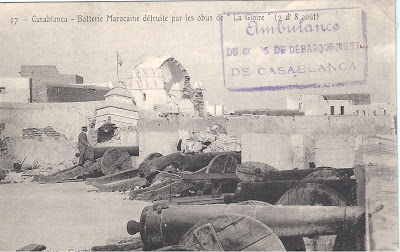
Moroccan artillery destroyed by French artillery shells

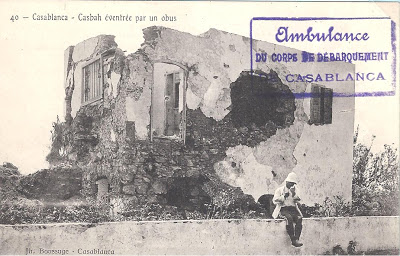
The qasbah destroyed by artillery shells

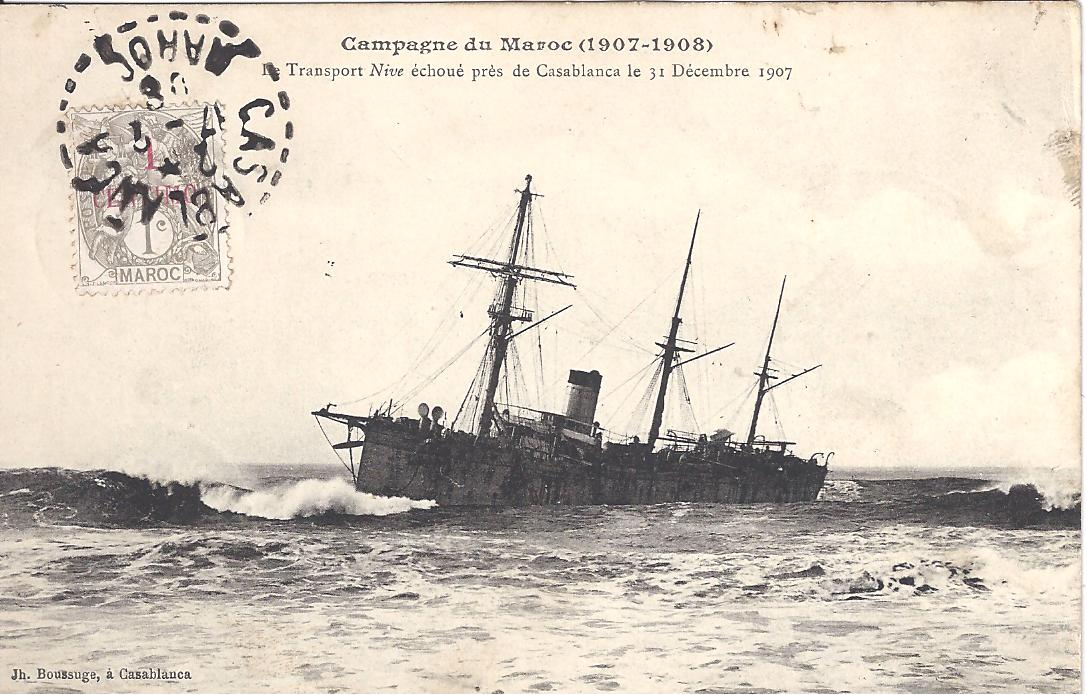
Nive on the rocks near Casablanca 31 December 1907

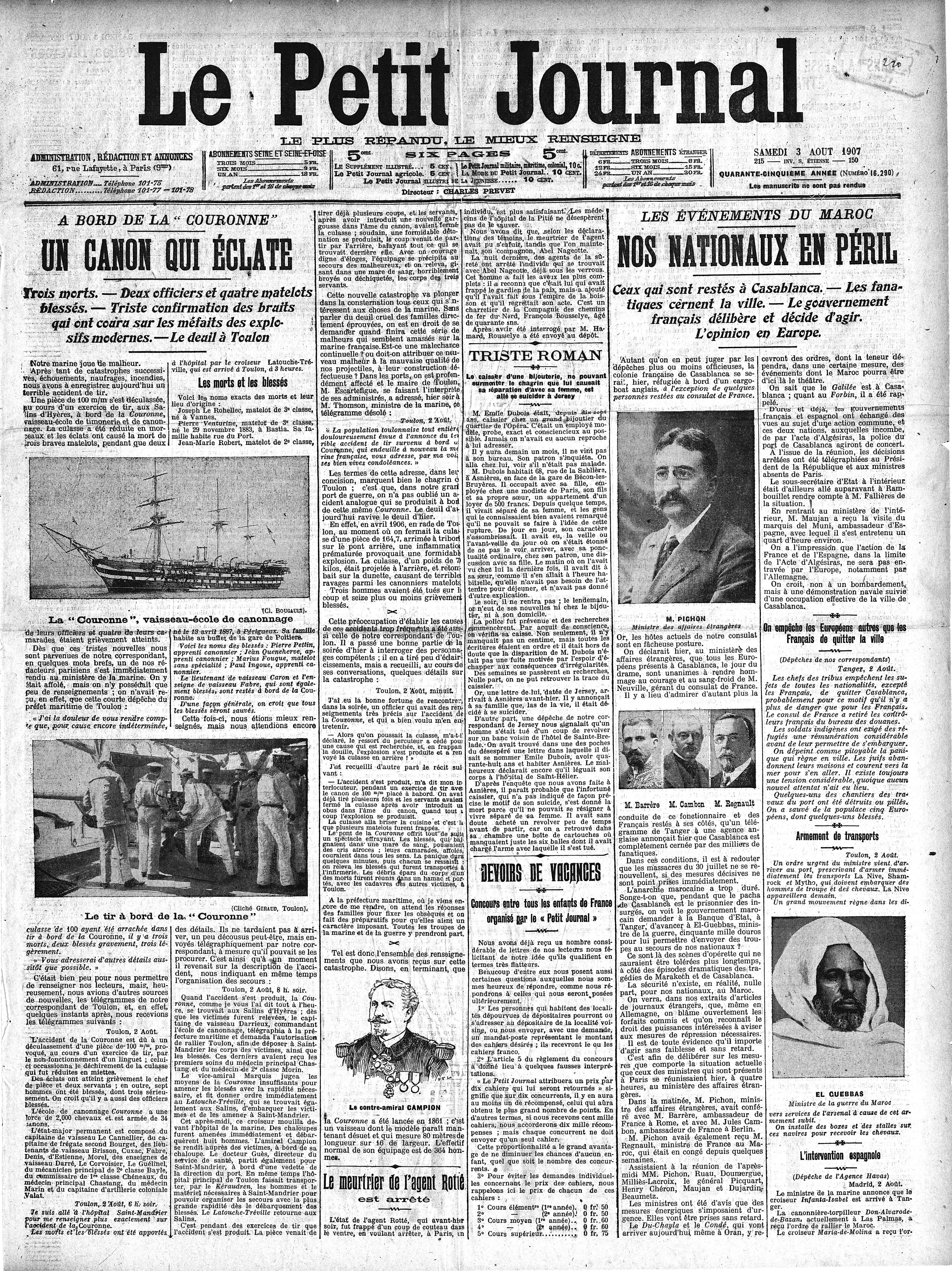
Front page of Le Petit Journal on 3 August 1907, reporting about the Bombardment of Casablanca during French conquest of Morocco

== See also ==
- Bombardment of Alexandria
- Bombardment of Algiers (disambiguation)
