= Shaikh Nasiruddin =

Indian cricketer (1916–1991)

Shaikh Mohammed Nasiruddin (9 August 1916 - 15 January 1991) was an Indian cricketer active from 1938 to 1942 who played for Northamptonshire (Northants) in 1938 and 1939.

He was born in Gujarat on 9 August 1916 and died in Karachi on 15 January 1991.

During the Second World War, he was in India where he represented the Muslims and Western India. He appeared in nine first-class matches as a righthanded batsman who scored 263 runs with a highest score of 64.

He appeared in two matches for Western India in 1941 alongside his father, Abdul Khaliq, who was also a cricketer.
