= Al-Khaliq =

One of the names of God in Islam

Al-Khaliq written in Arabic

Al-Khaliq or Khaliq (Arabic: الخالق) is one of the names of God (Arabic:Allah) in Islam, meaning "The Creator." This name shows that Allah is the one who, from nothing, created everything in existence.

== Different Meanings of Khalq in Arabic ==
Khalq (arabic: خلق), which is the Arabic root word for the name of God Al-Khaliq, has three different meanings in the Arabic language:

1- Khalq means bringing something from non-existence into existence, which is believed to be an ability that God alone is capable of. For example, in verse 25 of chapter 31 in the Quran, it is asked to the polytheists, who created (made khalq of) the heavens and the earth?

And if you asked them, "Who created the heavens and earth?" they would surely say, "Allāh." Say, "[All] praise is [due] to Allāh"; but most of them do not know.

— Verse 25, Chapter 31, The Quran [Sahih International]

Ibn Kathir, a renowned Theologian who died in 1373, commentated on this verse and said that the polytheists, which are the ones addressed by this verse, admit that Allah is the creator of the heavens and the earth and that everything is his creation and under his rule; and yet they refuse to worship Allah alone and still associate partners with him.

2- Khalq can also mean assembling something or scaffolding a material into a certain shape. For example, the Quran mentions the story of Issa (Jesus), who designed (made khalq of) a bird from clay and made it alive with the permission of God.

[The Day] when Allāh will say, "O Jesus, Son of Mary, remember My favor upon you and upon your mother when I supported you with the Pure Spirit [i.e., the angel Gabriel] and you spoke to the people in the cradle and in maturity; and [remember] when I taught you writing and wisdom and the Torah and the Gospel; and when you designed from clay [what was] like the form of a bird with My permission, then you breathed into it, and it became a bird with My permission; and you healed the blind [from birth] and the leper with My permission; and when you brought forth the dead with My permission; and when I restrained the Children of Israel from [killing] you when you came to them with clear proofs and those who disbelieved among them said, "This is not but obvious magic."

— Verse 110, Chapter 5, The Quran [Sahih International]

3- Khalq can also mean making something up or lying. This meaning is not believed to be attributable to God by Muslims. For example, the Quran mentions what the polytheists were saying about Muhammad's message and his creed of monotheism and that all that Muhammad is saying is fabrication (Arabic: ٱخۡتِلَٰقٌ, which comes from the root Khalq).

We have not heard of this in the latest religion. This is not but a fabrication.

— Verse 7, Chapter 38, The Quran [Sahih International]

== See also ==
- Names of God in Islam
- Abd al-Khaliq
