= Abdelkhalek Torres =

Moroccan journalist and leader

- عبد الخالق الطريس
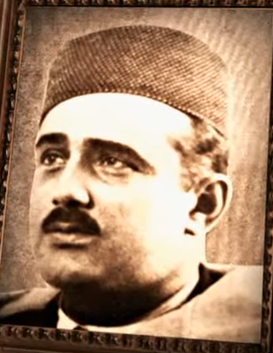

Minister of Justice
- In office 1961
- Monarch: Mohammed V
- Prime Minister: None
- Preceded by: Mohamed Bahnini
- Succeeded by: M'hamed Boucetta

Personal details
- Born: 1910
- Died: May 27, 1970 (aged 59–60)

Abdelkhalek Torres (Arabic: عبد الخالق الطريس; 1910 – May 27, 1970) was a Moroccan journalist and nationalist leader based in Tetouan, Morocco during the Spanish protectorate of Morocco era. He was the nephew of Muhammad Torres (1820-1908), the Minister of Foreign Affairs of Sultan Abdelaziz and his representative at the Algeciras Conference in 1906. He co-founded an Arabic newspaper entitled al-Hurriya (الحرية Freedom) along with Abdesalam Bennuna. In 1936, he founded a political party called al-Islah al-Watani (The National Reform) with backing from the Spanish Falangists with whom he enjoyed a good relationship.

Torres's 1934 play Intissar al haq (The Victory of the Right), "is still considered the first published Moroccan play," according to scholar Kamal Salhi.

His political activity from the 1930s on culminated in the independence of Morocco in 1956. In his later years, Torres served first as ambassador to Spain and Egypt, and then as Minister of Justice.
