= Abu Bakr Ibn Abi Zaid as-Slawi =

Official of Casablanca, Morocco

As-Sayid Abu Bakr Ibn Abi Zaid as-Slawi
- أبو بكر بن أبي زيد السلاوي
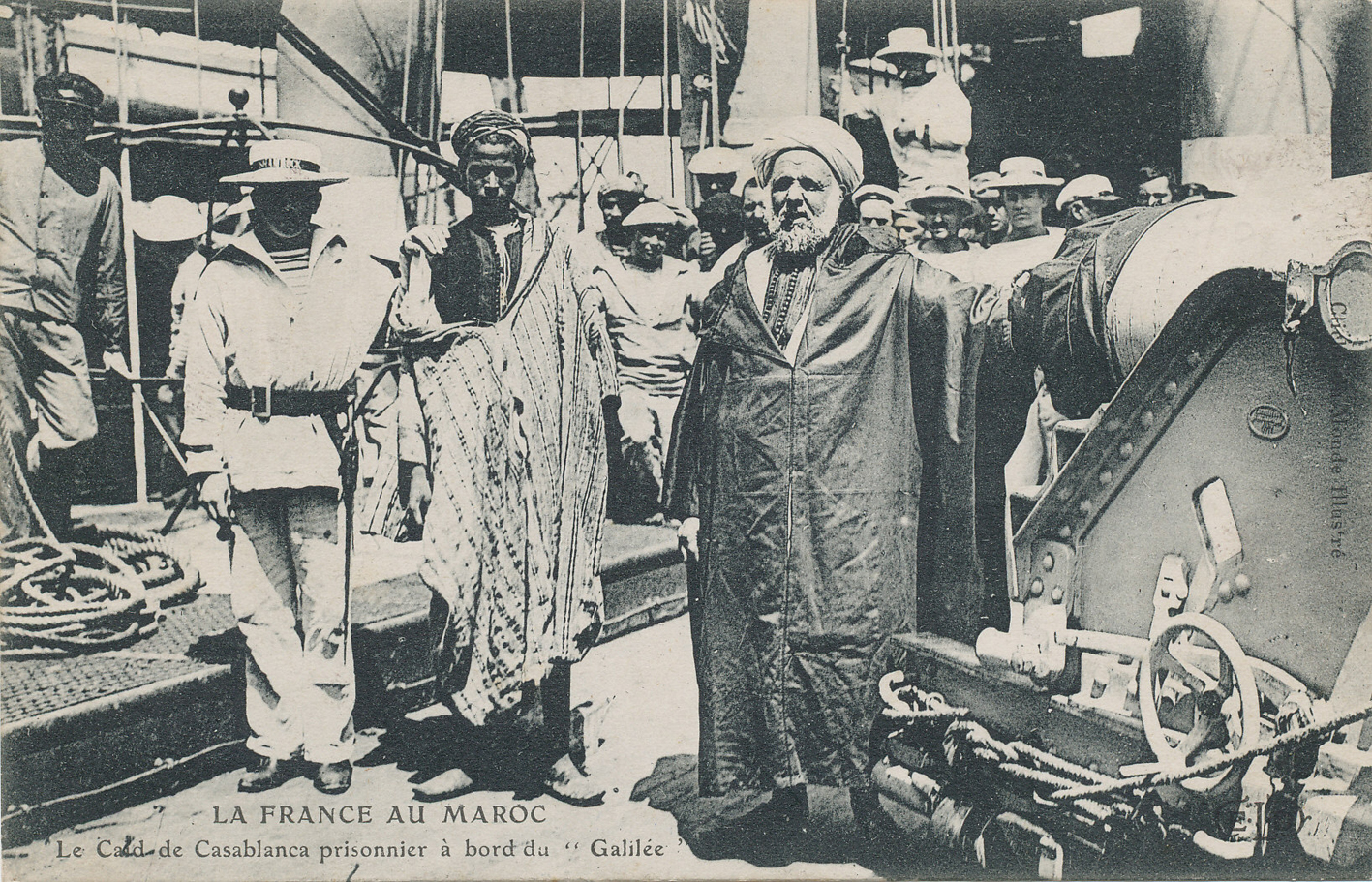

Abu Bakr Ibn Abi Zaid as-Slawi (Arabic: أبو بكر بن أبي زيد السلاوي) was the pasha, or qaid, of Casablanca, Morocco and the representative of the Makhzen in the city at the time of the French bombardment and invasion of the city on 5–7 August 1907.

== Biography ==
He was originally from Salé, Morocco. He was captured and detained aboard a French ship. French authorities transferred him to Algiers, which was under French control at the time. Muhammad Torres negotiated with the French authorities for his release.

He returned to Salé and lived as a Sufi mystic at a shrine there until his death. He was interred in Salé.
