= Condé, Indre =

Condé
- Commune
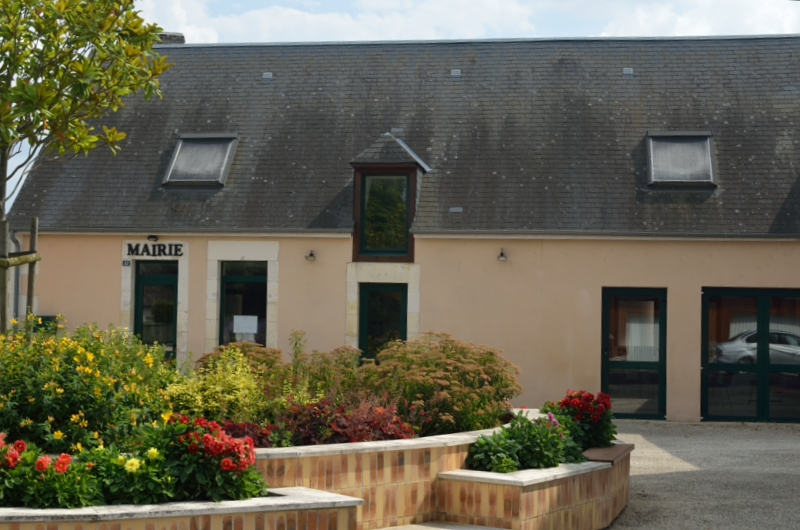
- The town hall in Condé
- Location of Condé
- Location within France Location within Centre-Val de Loire
- Coordinates: 46°52′47″N 1°59′12″E
- Country: France
- Region: Centre-Val de Loire
- Department: Indre
- Arrondissement: Issoudun
- Canton: La Châtre
- Intercommunality: Champagne Boischauts

Government
  - Mayor (2020–2026): Christian Lafond
- Area^{1}: 23.82 km^{2} (9.20 sq mi)
- Elevation: 160 m (520 ft)
- Highest elevation: 168 m (551 ft)
- Lowest elevation: 130 m (430 ft)
- Population (2023): 226
  - Density: 9.49/km^{2} (24.6/sq mi)
- Time zone: UTC+01:00 (CET)
  - Summer (DST): UTC+02:00 (CEST)
- INSEE/Postal code: 36059 /36100
- ^{1} French Land Register data, which excludes lakes, ponds, glaciers > 1 km^{2} (0.386 sq mi or 247 acres) and river estuaries.

Condé (French pronunciation: [kɔ̃de]) is a commune in the Indre department in central France.

== Population ==
Historical population
Year	Pop.	±% p.a.
1968	227	—
1975	171	−3.97%
1982	211	+3.05%
1990	228	+0.97%
1999	231	+0.15%
2007	230	−0.05%
2012	244	+1.19%
2017	238	−0.50%
2023	226	−0.86%
Source: INSEE

== See also ==
- Communes of the Indre department
