= Port of Casablanca =

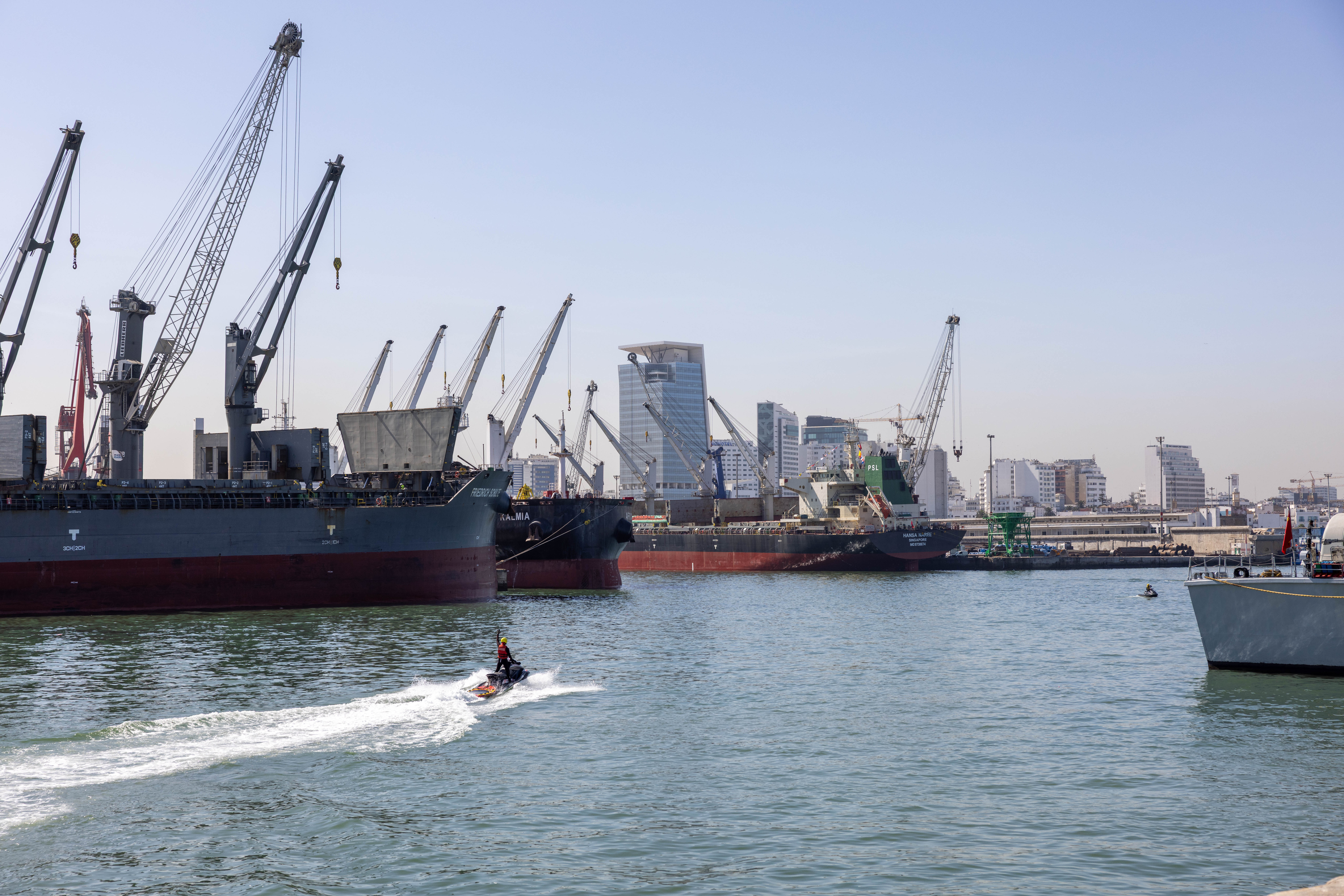
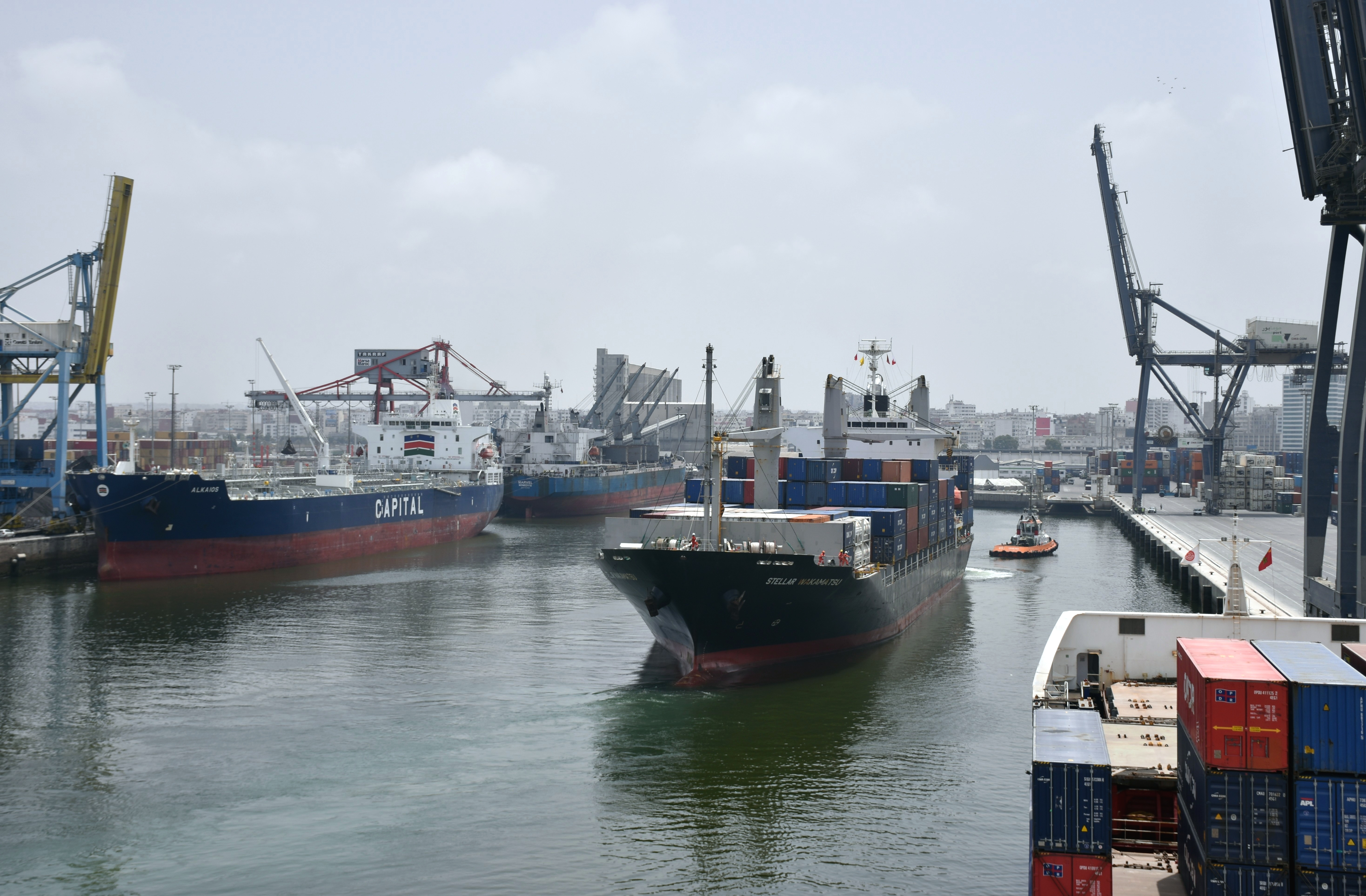
- Interactive map of Port of Casablanca

Location
- Country: Morocco
- Coordinates: 33°36′N 7°37′W
- UN/LOCODE: MACAS

Details
- Operated by: Marsa Maroc

Statistics
- Website https://www.anp.org.ma/en/

The Port of Casablanca (Arabic: ميناء الدار البيضاء , French: Port de Casablanca ) refers to the collective facilities and terminals that conduct maritime trade handling functions in Casablanca's harbours and which handle Casablanca's shipping. The port is located near Hassan II Mosque.

The Port of Casablanca is one of the largest artificial ports in Morocco and in the world, though it was eclipsed when Tangiers-Med—a cargo port 40 km east of Tangiers and the largest on the Mediterranean coast of Africa in terms of capacity—went into service in 2007. The Port of Casablanca's initial capacity was 3,5 million shipment containers.

Casablanca's port handles more than 21,3 million tons of traffic annually, which is to say 38% of Moroccan traffic, and carries out a sales turnover of more than 894 Million Moroccan Dirhams. With an extent of 605 hectares and extending to more than 8 kilometers in length. It can accommodate and treat more than 35 ships at the same time.

The port is managed by Marsa Maroc, the successor of ODEP (Office D'Exploitation des Ports), a publicly owned establishment which has the principal role of ensuring the management of passengers, goods and ships passing through the Moroccan ports.

== History ==
Before being invaded by the Portuguese in the 16th century, Casablanca used to be known as Anfa. The Portuguese used the ruins of Anfa to build a military fortress in 1515, and were eventually expelled by the Moroccan Saadi Dynasti in 1530. The foundation of the current port started during the reign of Sidi Mohammed Bin Abdellah, the Alawi Sultan of Morocco in the 18th century. It is this Sultan who named it Addar Al Beida, or Casablanca. In the 19th century, the area's population began to grow as Casablanca became a major supplier of wool to the booming textile industry in Britain and shipping traffic increased. The British, in return, began importing gunpowder tea, a key ingredient in Morocco's national drink, mint tea. By the 1860s, there were around 4,000 residents, and the population grew to around 9,000 by the late 1880s . Casablanca remained a modestly sized port, with a population reaching around 12,000 within a few years of the French conquest and arrival of French colonialists in the town—at first as administrators within a sovereign sultanate, in 1912.

The Moroccan administration of the time entrusted to the Compagnie Marocaine the construction of a small port whose water surface to be sheltered does not exceed 10 hectares. The work started in 1906, consisted of the construction of two small piers out of grip of share and others of the wet dock. The port of Casablanca began to be developed in 1906.

After completion in 1938, the configuration of the port had taken form and included a water level of a surface of 125 hectares, moles, quay levels and quays for the accosting of the trading ships.

The port has known important works of extension including the prolongation of the two facilities for phosphates shipping and the completion of citrus fruits facility in the 1950s until the 1980s. Many other works are ongoing since 2013, ordered by the Marsa-Maroc.

A new cruise terminal with a capacity of 450.000 passengers was commissioned in 2022.

== Gallery ==
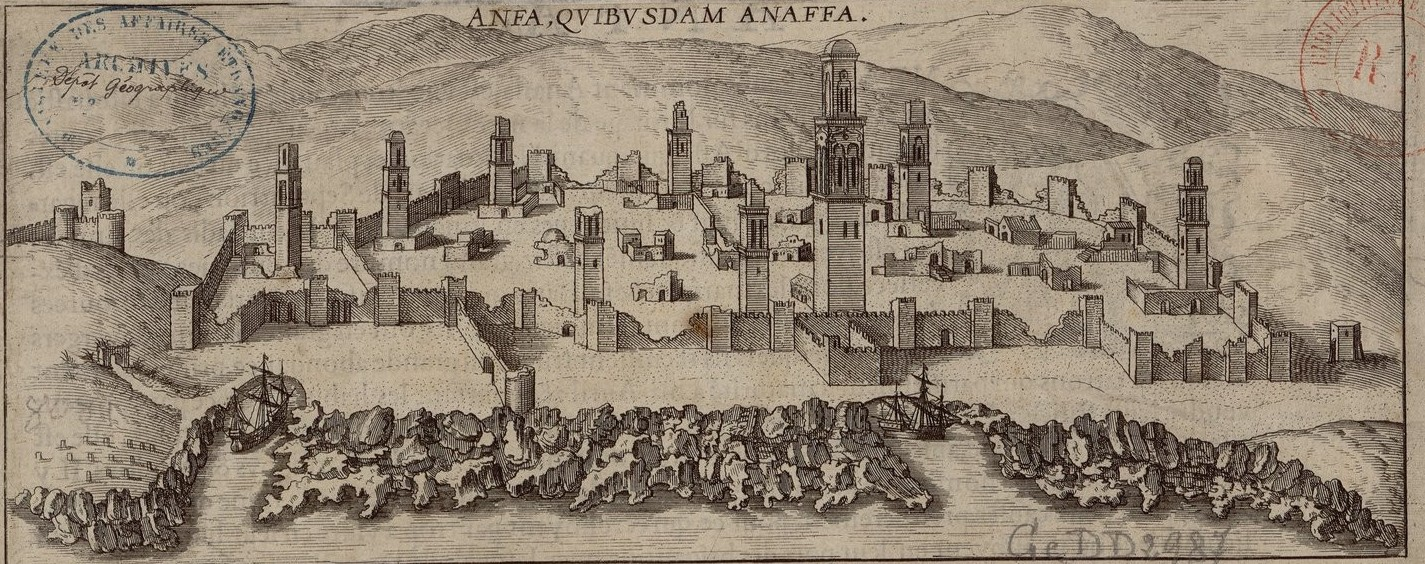
The Portuguese wet dock in 1572 which corresponds to the current dry dock

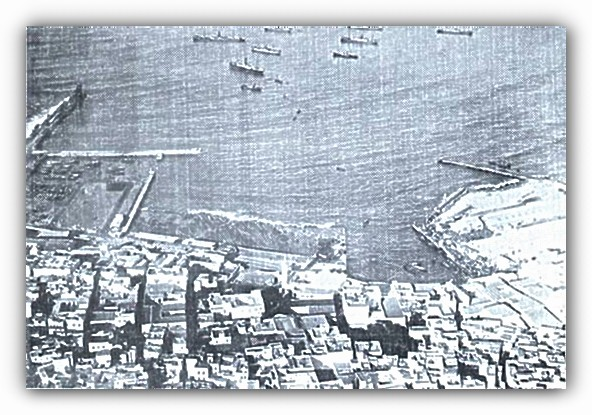
The port under construction in 1915

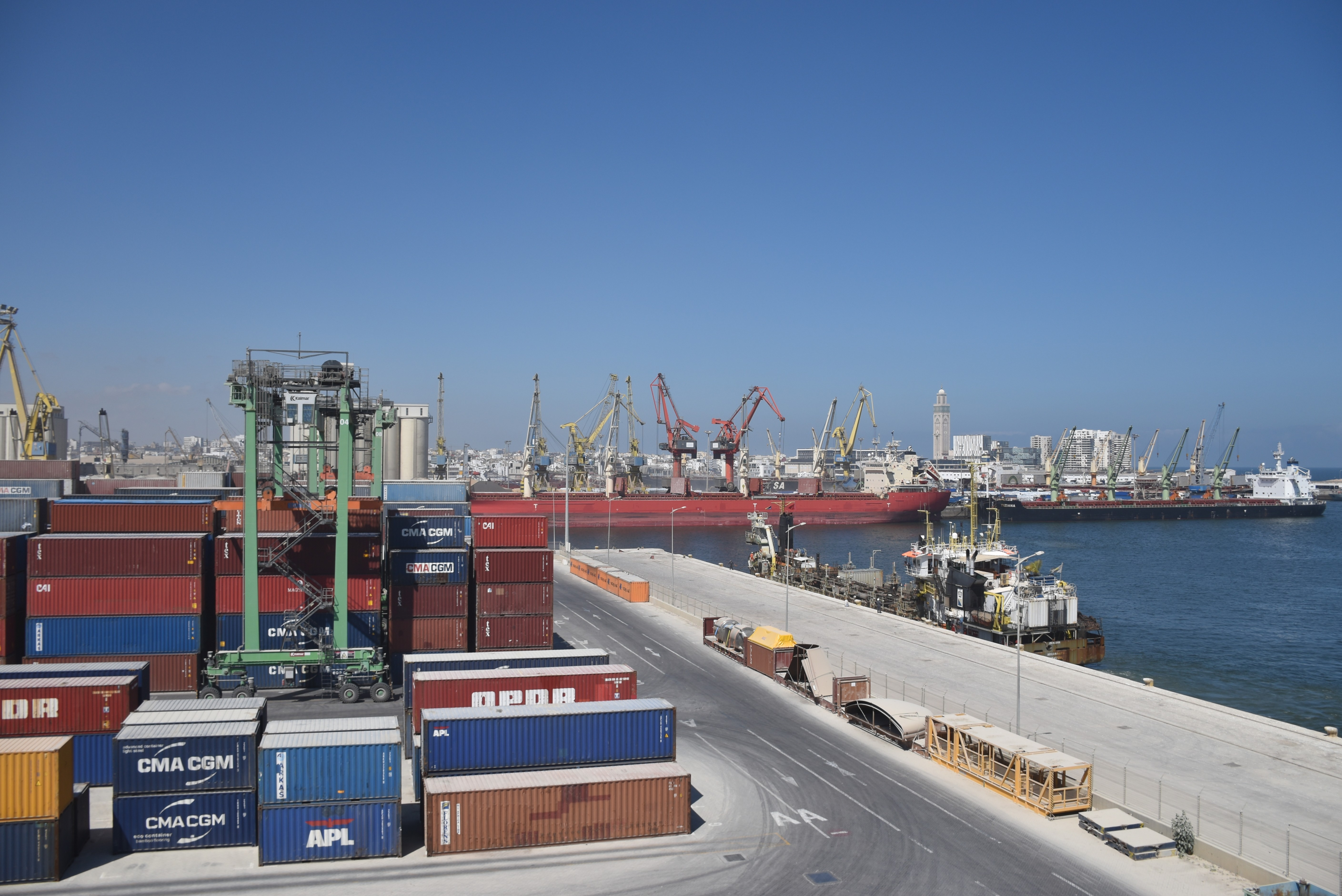
Casablanca port in 2018

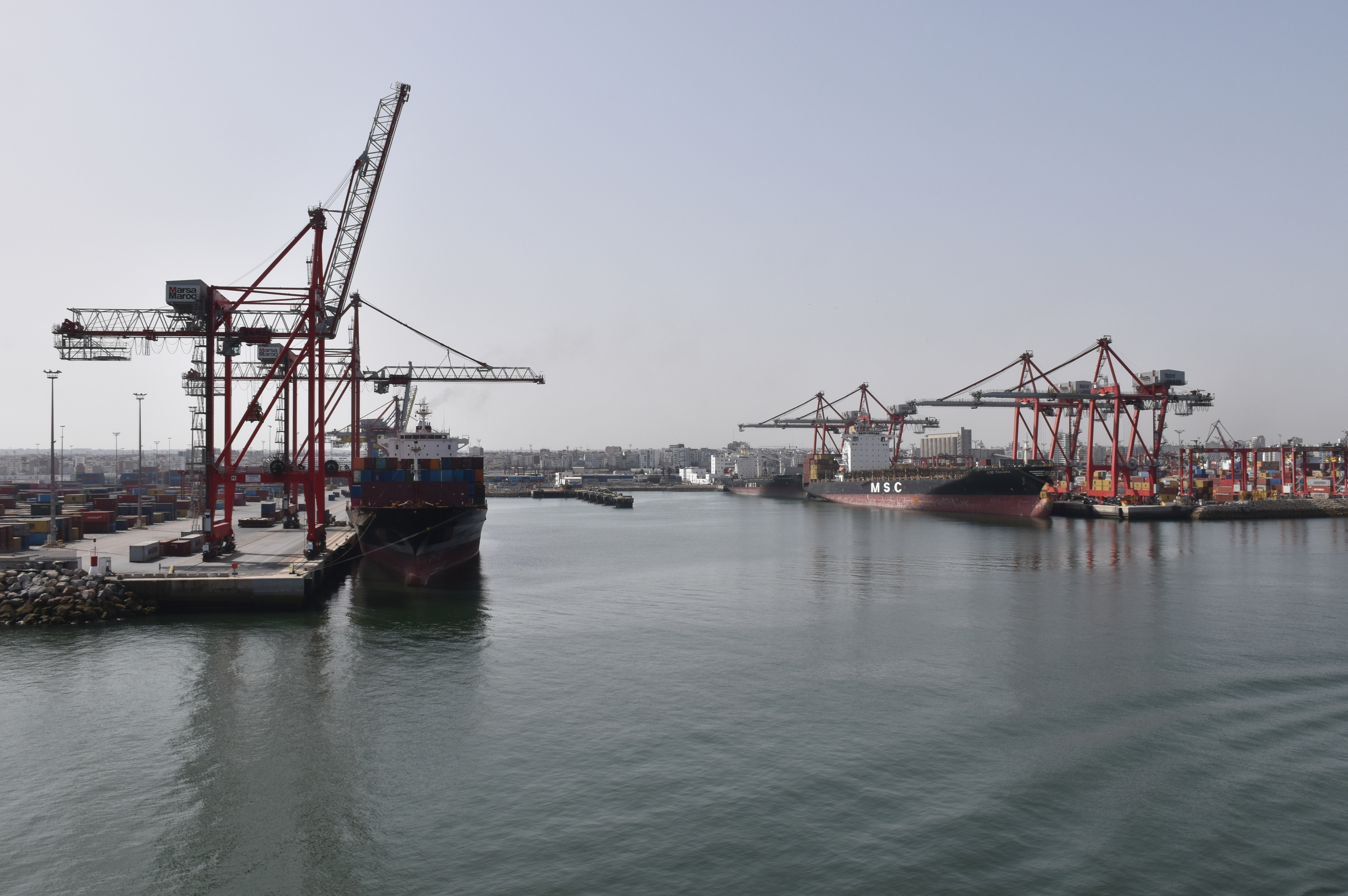
The container port in 2023
Construction of the breakwater in 1916

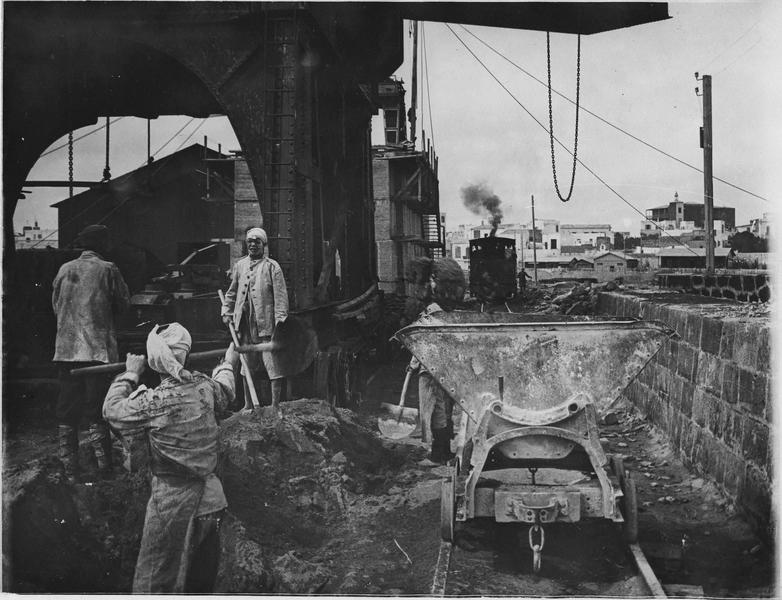

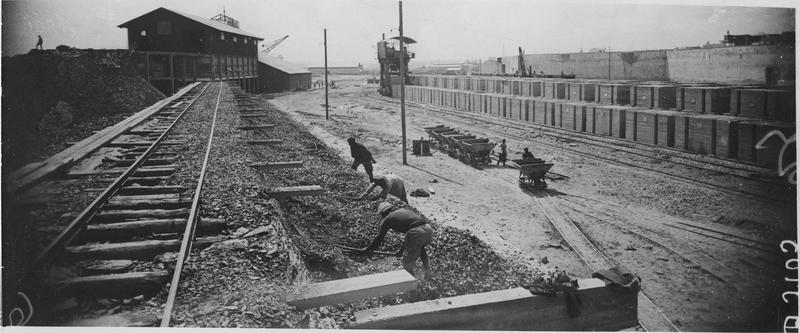

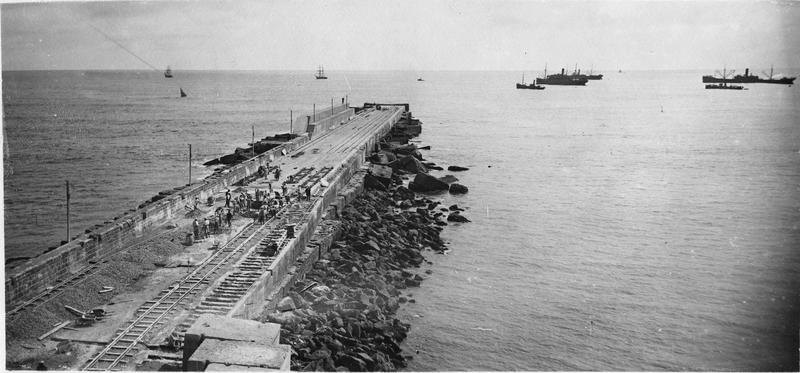

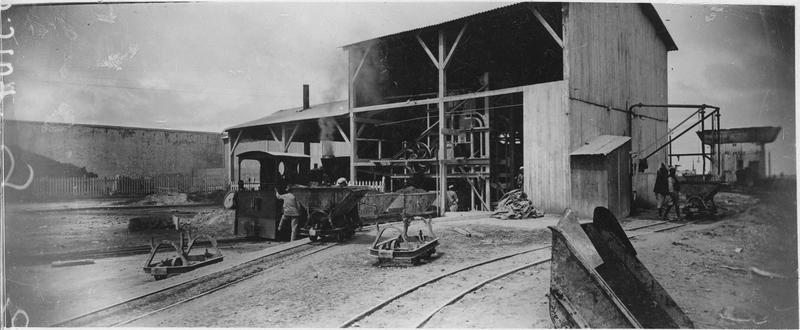

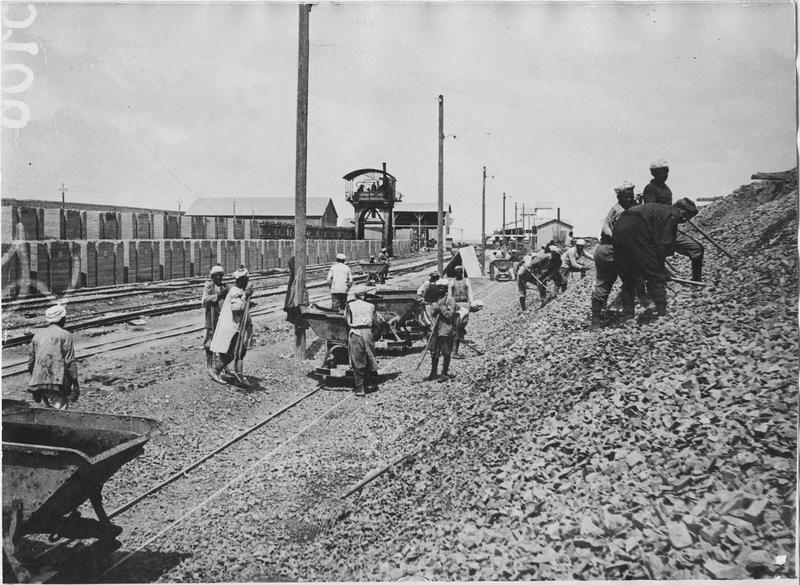

== See also ==
- Mohammed V International Airport
