= Abdul Khaliq (cricketer) =

Indian cricketer (1896–1943)

Personal information
- Full name: KS Abdul Khaliq
- Born: 5 November 1896
- Died: 24 August 1943 (aged 46)
- Relatives: Shaikh Nasiruddin (son)

Career statistics
Competition	First class
Matches	19
Runs scored	439
Batting average	15.13
100s/50s	0/1
Top score	76
Catches/stumpings	8/0
- Source: , 9 March 2017

Abdul Khaliq (5 November 1896 – 24 August 1943) was an Indian cricketer, who played 19 first-class cricket matches for Sind, Western India, Karachi and Western India States between 1933 and 1942. He became Sheikh Sahib of Mangrol in 1941.

Abdul Khaliq appeared in two matches for Western India in 1941 alongside his son Shaikh Nasiruddin.
