= Abdul Khaliq Masood =

Abdul Khaliq Masood عبد الخالق مسعود
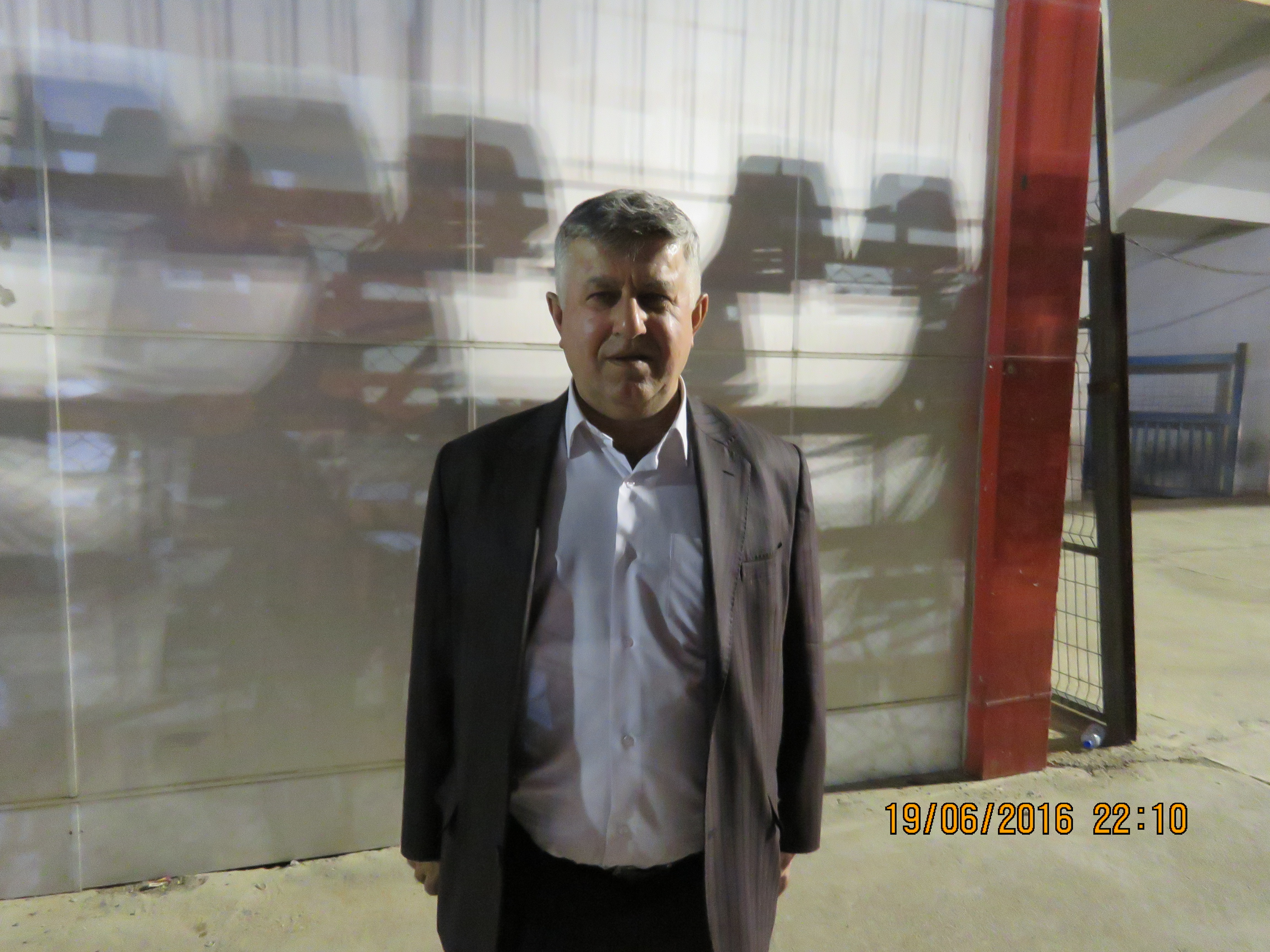
- Masood in 2016

President of Iraq Football Association
- In office 2014–2020

Vice President of Erbil SC
- Incumbent
- Assumed office 9 October 2015

Personal details
- Born: Abdul Khaliq Masood Ahmed; 21 February 1955 (age 71) Erbil, Iraq

Abdul Khaliq Masood Ahmed (Arabic: عبد الخالق مسعود أحمد) (born 21 January 1955) is the former president of the Iraq Football Association. He served as the financial secretary of the federation when Hussein Saeed was president from 2004 to 2011. He was the vice president of the Iraqi Football Association under Najeh Humoud from 2011 to 2014 and then, in May 2014, he was able to excel in the elections of the Football Association and become president. He previously served as Vice President of Erbil SC.
