= Compagnie Marocaine =

French colonial holding company

La Compagnie Marocaine
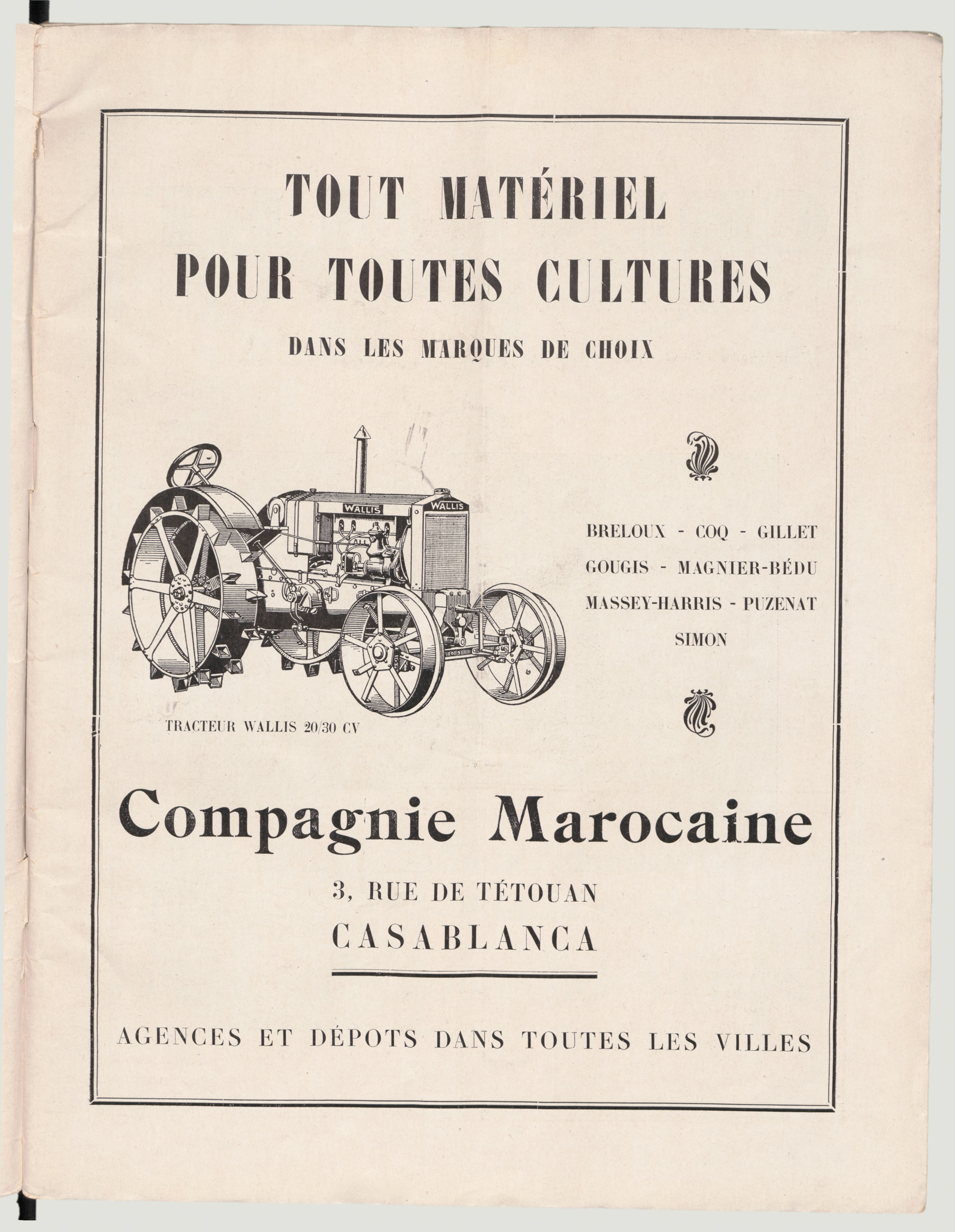
- An advertisement for the Compagnie Marocaine in La Terre Marocaine dated December 1, 1928
- Company type: holding company
- Industry: international trade
- Headquarters: France

La Compagnie Marocaine (the Moroccan Company) was a French colonial holding company founded in 1902 for the purpose of exploiting Morocco.

== History ==
In 1902, a group of industrialists led by Eugène Schneider II founded the Société des établissements Gautsch with the purpose of organizing commercial, industrial, and agricultural activities in Morocco. The Schnneider compagnie had already been awarded the construction of a 10-kilometer railway, and was promised the construction of the Rabat-Marrakech line. Sultan Abdelaziz of Morocco had been in power since 1894, and was a liberal open to investors from all boards, launching an economic race between Europe's main banks to grab large development contracts. In December 1903, the Société des établissements Gautsch became the Compagnie Marocaine, and received the official support of France's Ministry of Foreign Affairs. The subsidiary Compagnie d'Agadir was created in 1905 to lead land prospection in Morocco.

Eugène Schneider II was its first president.

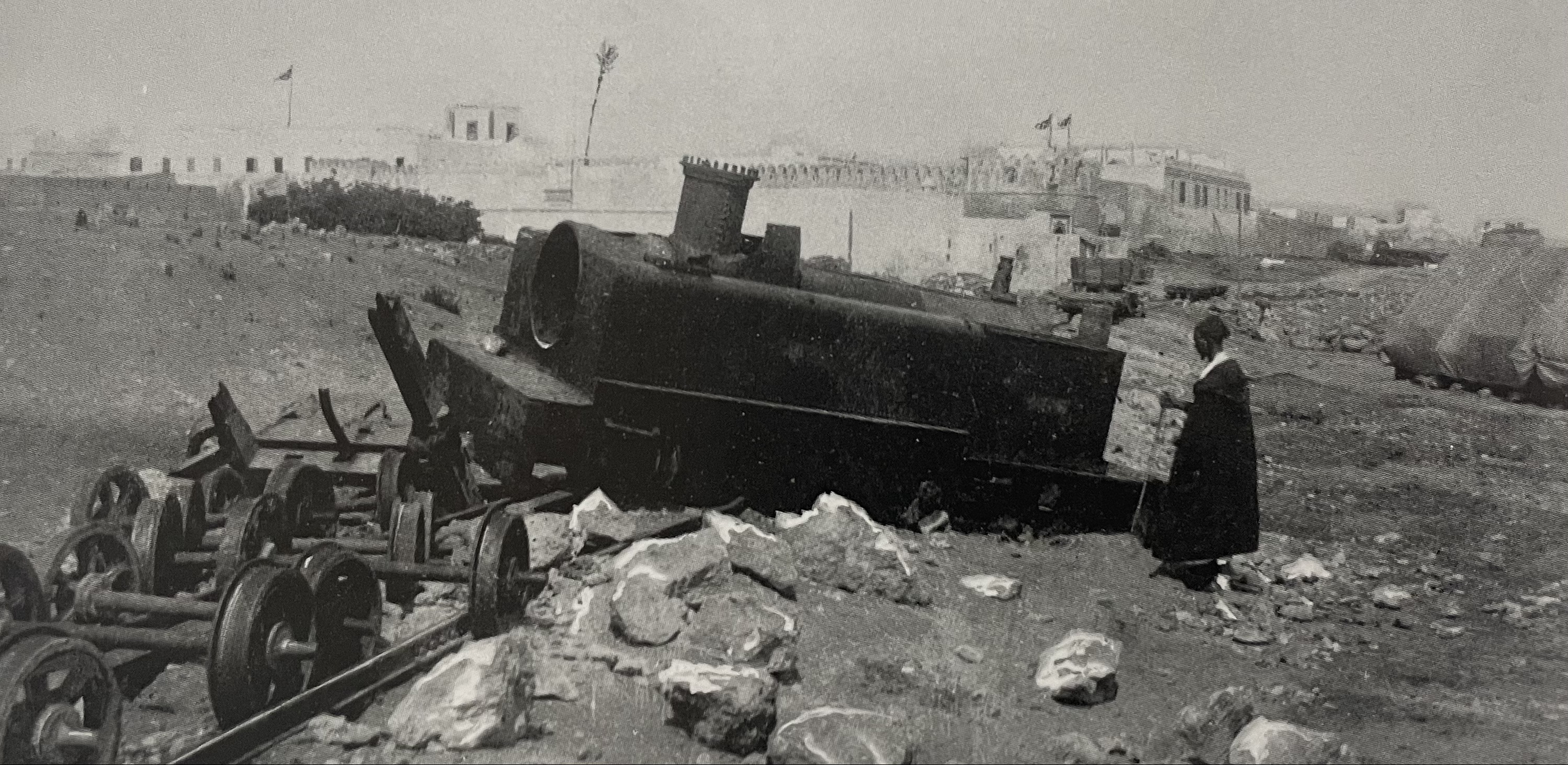
A man inspects the derailed Decauville locomotive belonging to La Compagnie Marocaine in 1907.

The Treaty of Algeciras of 1906, which formalized French preeminence in Morocco and precipitated the establishment of a French protectorate in Morocco, accorded a contract to construct modern ports in Casablanca and Asfi to Compagnie Marocaine. In fact, it was an attack on the company's Decauville train that incited the Bombardment of Casablanca in August 1907, marking the beginning of the French conquest of Morocco.

Starting in 1911, in order to secure an increase in capital, the presidency went to a representative of the Banque de l'Union Parisienne.

It participated in the creation of the Compagnie des Chemins de Fer du Maroc (Railroad Company of Morocco) and become a main shareholder.

La Compagnie Marocaine was listed in the Paris Bourse in 1920.

== Administration ==
=== List of presidents ===
- 1903-1911: Eugène Schneider II
- 1911-1914: Jules-Frédéric Lambert, marquis de Frondeville
- 1914?-1922: Max Boucard
- 1922-1923: Cornelis de Witt
- 1923-1958: Jacques Feray

== See also ==
- Compagnie Algérienne

== Bibliography ==
- Pierre Guillen, L'implatation de Schneider au Maroc, les débuts de la Compagnie marocaine (1902-1906), 1965
- André Adam, Histoire de Casablanca: des origines à 1914, 1968
- Mohamed Bouzidi, Histoire économique, le Maroc précolonial, 1981
