= French protectorate in Morocco =

1912–1956 French protectorate in northwest Africa

Coordinates: 32°N 6°W

French protectorate in Morocco Protectorat français au Maroc (French) الحماية الفرنسية في المغرب (Arabic) Al-ḥimaya al-faransia fi al-maghrib
- 1912–1956
- Merchant Ensign Coat of arms
- Anthem: La Marseillaise (de facto) Cherifian Anthem النشيد الشريف (Arabic) (from 1950s; traditional, instrumental only)
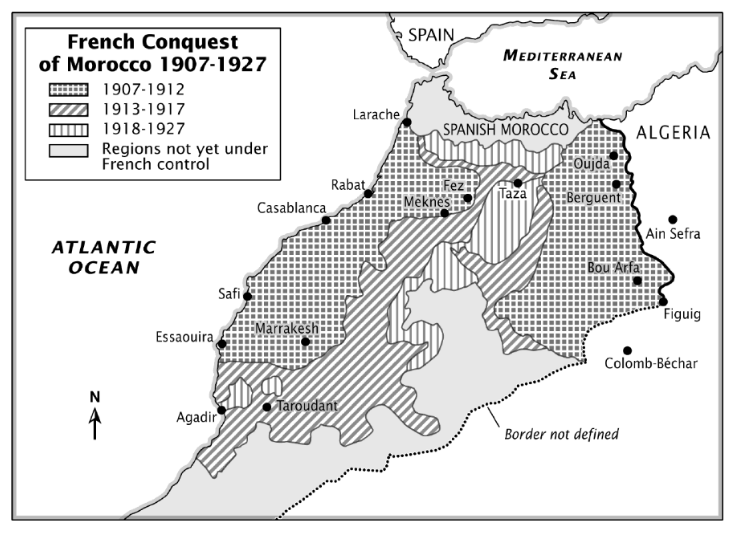
- The French conquest of Morocco, c. 1907–1927
- Status: Protectorate of France
- Capital: Rabat
- Official languages: French
- Common languages: Moroccan Arabic; Hassaniya Arabic; Berber languages
- Religion: Sunni Islam; Judaism; Roman Catholicism
- Government: Absolute monarchy (under colonial administration)
- Sultan
  - 1912–1927: Yusef
  - 1927–1953: Mohammed V
  - 1953–1955: Mohammed VI (Note: Mohammed Ben Aarafa was put in place by the French as "Mohammed VI" after his predecessor was ousted by them but was not recognized in the Spanish-protected part of Morocco)
  - 1955–1956: Mohammed V
- Resident-General
  - 1912–1925 (first): Hubert Lyautey
  - 1955–1956 (last): André Louis Dubois
- Historical era: Interwar period
  - Treaty of Fes: 30 March 1912
  - Independence: 7 April 1956
- Currency: Moroccan rial (1912–1921); Moroccan franc (1921–1956); French franc (de facto official)
Preceded by	Succeeded by
Sultanate of Morocco	Kingdom of Morocco

The French protectorate in Morocco (French: Protectorat français au Maroc; Arabic: الحماية الفرنسية في المغرب), also known as French Morocco (French: Maroc français), was the period of French colonial rule in Morocco that lasted from 1912 to 1956. The protectorate was officially established 30 March 1912, when Sultan Abd al-Hafid signed the Treaty of Fez, though the French military occupation had begun with the invasion of Oujda and the bombardment of Casablanca in 1907.

The protectorate lasted until after World War II with the dissolution of the Treaty of Fez on 2 March 1956, with the Franco-Moroccan Joint Declaration. Morocco's independence movement, described in Moroccan historiography as the Revolution of the King and the People, restored the exiled Mohammed V but it did not end the French presence in Morocco. France preserved its influence in the country, including a right to station French troops and to have a say in Morocco's foreign policy. French settlers also maintained their rights and property.

While the agreements with France had provided for interdependent foreign relations, Franco-Moroccan relations quickly worsened following Mohammed V's outspoken support for Algerian independence including at the United Nations. The number of French settlers declined constantly, especially after their agricultural holdings were nationalized. Relations improved once the last French troops left Morocco in November 1961, with France remaining Morocco's main trading partner.

The French protectorate existed alongside the Spanish protectorate, which was established and dissolved in the same years; its borders consisted of the area of Morocco between the Corridor of Taza and the Draa River, including sparse tribal lands.

== Prelude ==
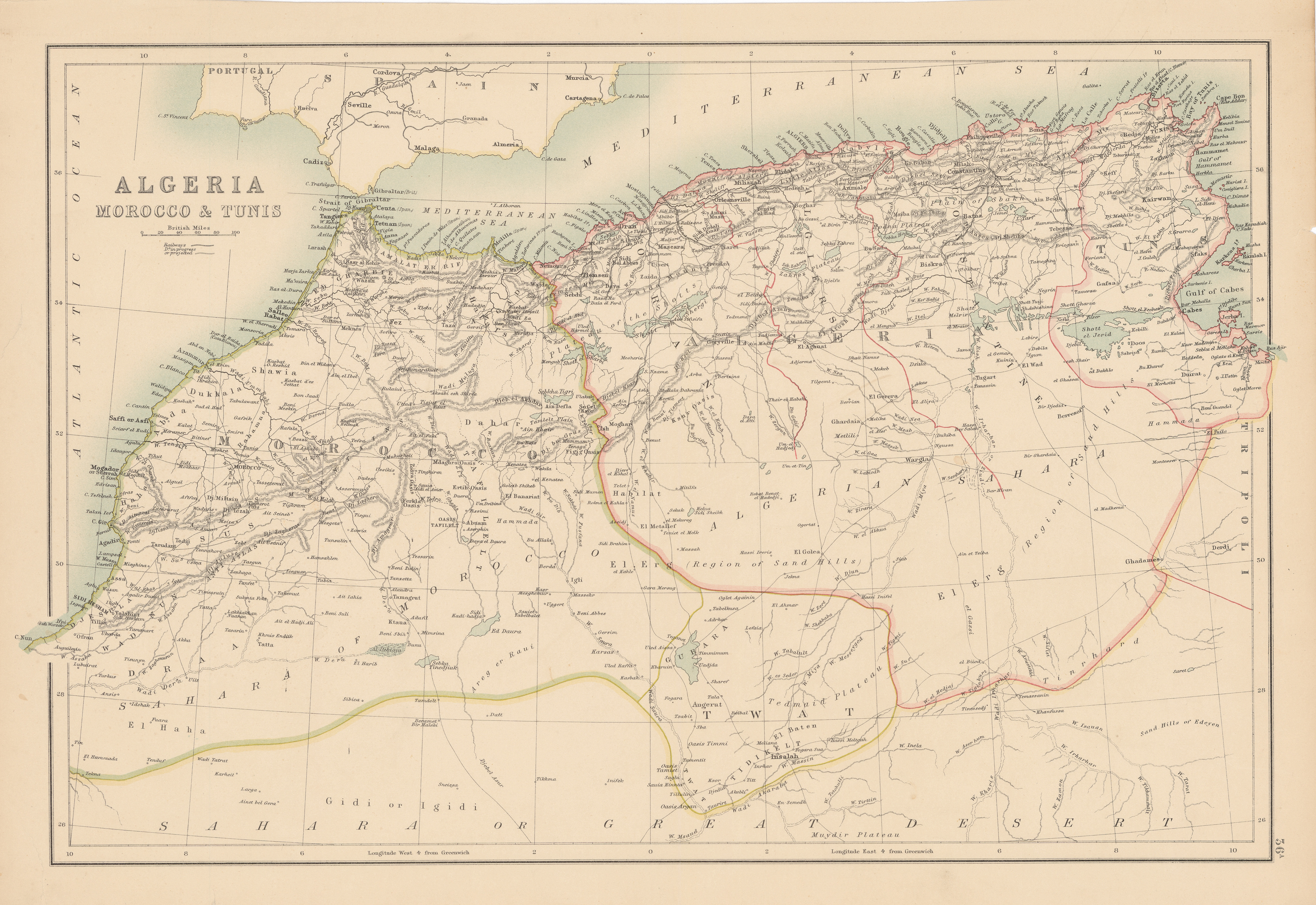
The Maghreb in the second half of the 19th century

Despite the weakness of its authority, the 'Alawi dynasty distinguished itself in the eighteenth and nineteenth centuries by maintaining Morocco’s independence while other states in the region succumbed to French or British domination. However, in the second part of the nineteenth century, Morocco’s weakness and instability invited European intervention to protect threatened investments and to demand economic concessions. Following the Hispano-Moroccan War of 1859–1860, Spain obtained the recognition by Morocco of its perpetual sovereignty over Ceuta, Melilla and the Chafarinas Islands as well as of the territory of Ifni. The first years of the twentieth century witnessed a rush of diplomatic maneuvering through which the European powers, France in particular, furthered their interests in North Africa.

French activity in Morocco began at the end of the nineteenth century. In 1904, the French government was trying to establish a protectorate over Morocco and had managed to sign two bilateral secret agreements with Britain (8 April 1904, see Entente cordiale) and Spain (7 October 1904), which guaranteed the support of the powers in question in this endeavor. That same year, France sponsored the creation of the Moroccan Debt Administration in Tangier. France and Spain secretly partitioned the territory of the sultanate, with Spain receiving concessions in the far north and south of the country.

=== First Moroccan Crisis: March 1905 – May 1906 ===
The First Moroccan Crisis took place owing to the imperial rivalries of the great powers, in this case, between Germany on one side and France, with British support, on the other. Germany took immediate diplomatic action to block the new accord from going into effect, including the dramatic visit of Wilhelm II to Tangier on 31 March 1905. Kaiser Wilhelm tried to get Morocco's support if they went to war with France or Britain, and gave a speech expressing support for Moroccan independence, which amounted to a provocative challenge to French influence in Morocco.

In 1906, the Algeciras Conference was held to settle the dispute. Germany accepted an agreement in which France agreed to yield control of the Moroccan police, but otherwise retained effective control of Moroccan political and financial affairs. Although the Algeciras Conference temporarily solved the First Moroccan Crisis it only worsened international tensions between the Triple Alliance and the Triple Entente.

=== French invasion ===
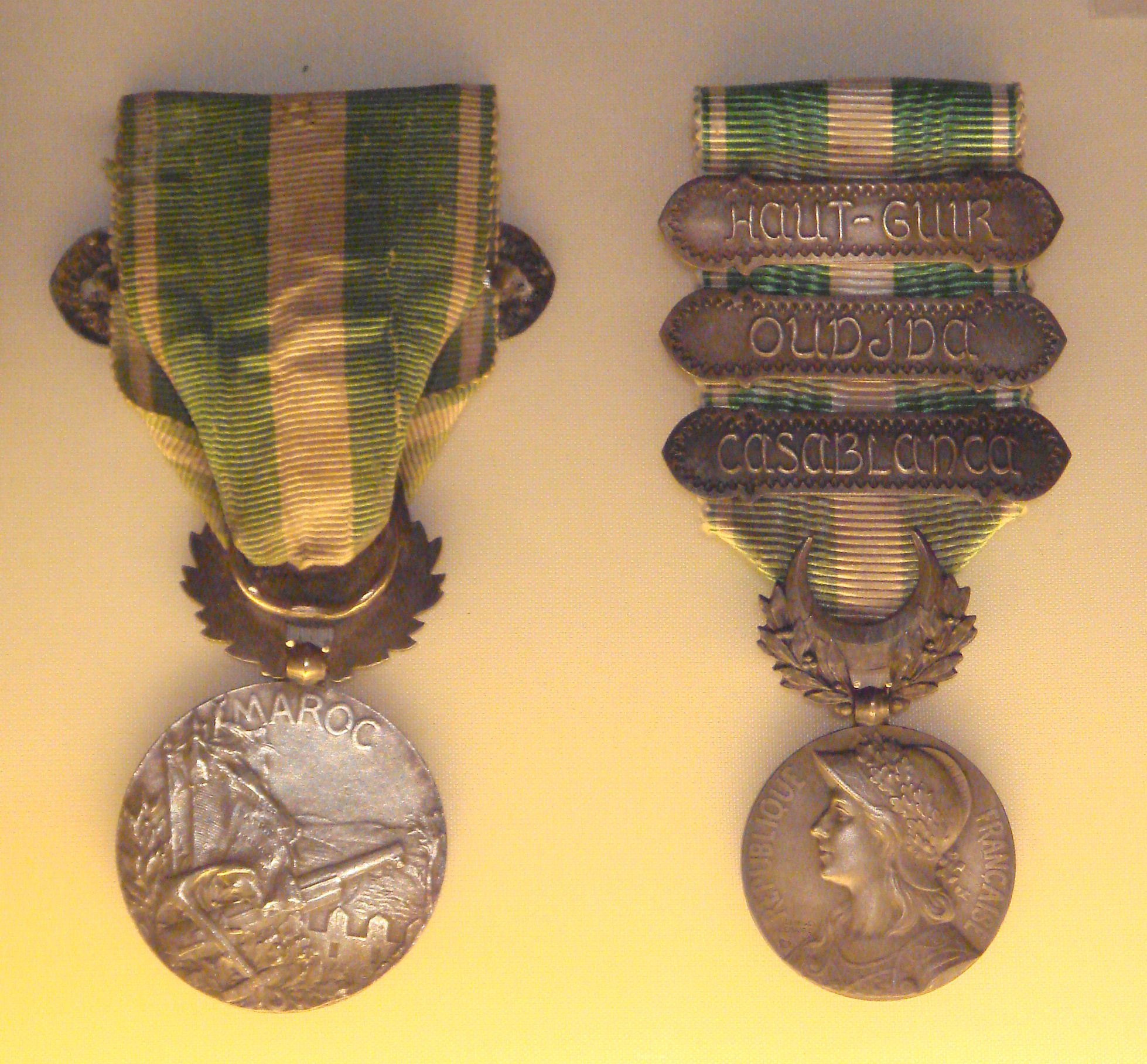
1909 Morocco commemorative medal—distributed to French soldiers that participated in the French invasion of Morocco

The French military conquest of Morocco began in the aftermath of Émile Mauchamp's assassination in Marrakesh on 19 March 1907. In the French press, his death was characterized as an "unprovoked and indefensible attack from the barbarous natives of Morocco." Hubert Lyautey seized his death as a pretext to invade Oujda from the east.

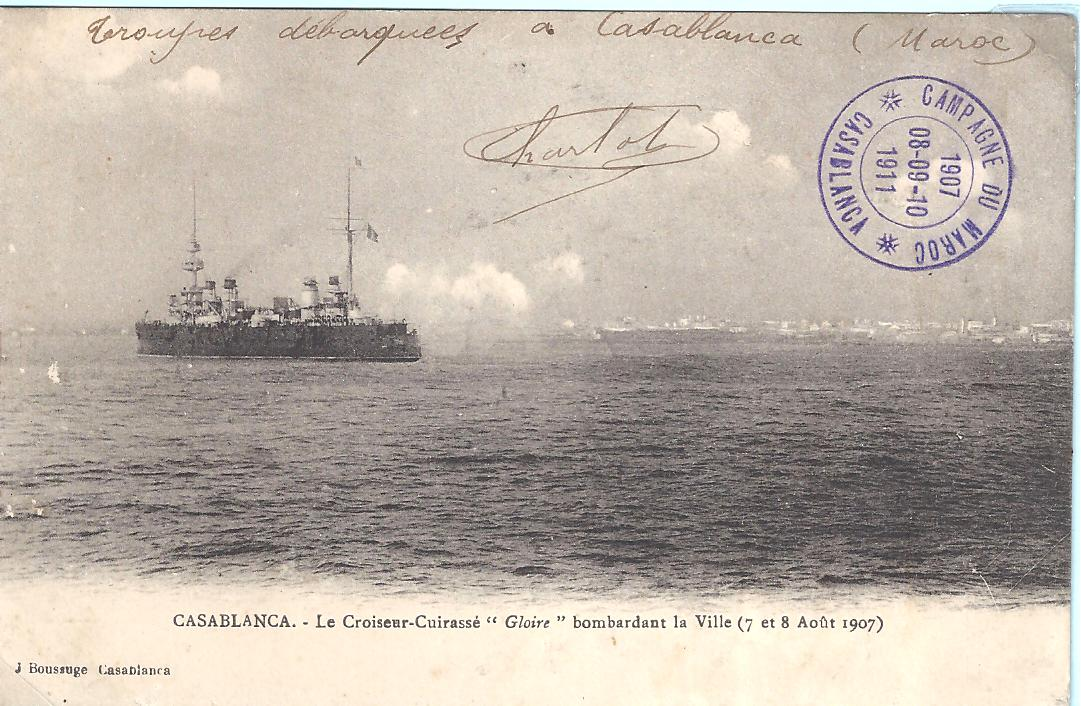
The French cruiser Gloire in the Bombardment of Casablanca August 1907, printed on a postcard

In the summer of 1907, tribes of the Chaouia led a revolt against the application of terms of the 1906 Treaty of Algeciras in Casablanca, killing nine European laborers working on the rail line between the port and a quarry in Roches Noires. The French responded with a naval bombardment of Casablanca from 5–7 August, and went on to occupy and "pacify" Casablanca and the Chaouia plain, marking the beginning of the French invasion from the west.

=== Hafidiya ===
Sultan Abdelaziz did virtually nothing in response to French aggressions and occupation of Oujda and Chaouia. As a result, there was growing pressure for a jihad in defense of Morocco, particularly from Muhammad al-Kattani and the people of Fes. After the southern aristocrats pledged support to the sultan's brother, Abd al-Hafid, the people of Fes also pledged their support, though qualified by an unprecedented Conditional Bay'ah. France supported Abdelaziz and promoted him in their propaganda newspaper Es-Saada (السعادة). After defeating Abdelaziz in battle in 1908, Abd al-Hafid became the recognized leader of Morocco in 1909.

=== Agadir Crisis ===
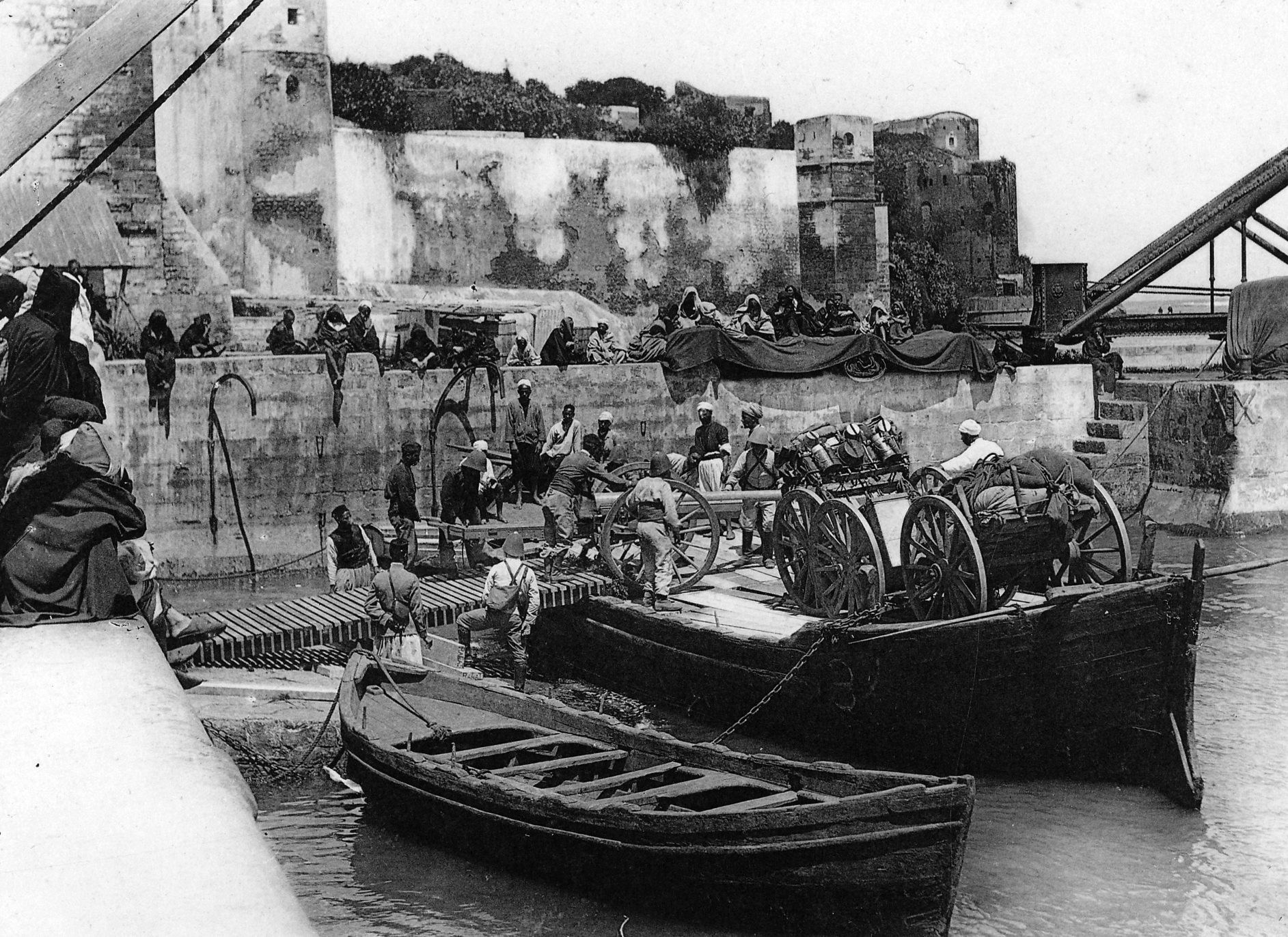
French artillery at Rabat in 1911

In 1911, a rebellion broke out against Abd al-Hafid. By early April 1911, the Sultan was besieged in his palace in Fez and the French prepared to send troops to help suppress the rebellion under the pretext of protecting European lives and property. The French dispatched a flying column at the end of April 1911 and Germany gave approval for the occupation of the city. Moroccan forces besieged the French-occupied city. Approximately one month later, French forces brought the siege to an end. On 5 June 1911 the Spanish occupied Larache and Alcazaquibir (Ksar-el-Kebir). On 1 July 1911, the German gunboat Panther arrived at the port of Agadir. There was an immediate reaction from the French, supported by the British.

== History ==
=== French protectorate (1912–1956) ===
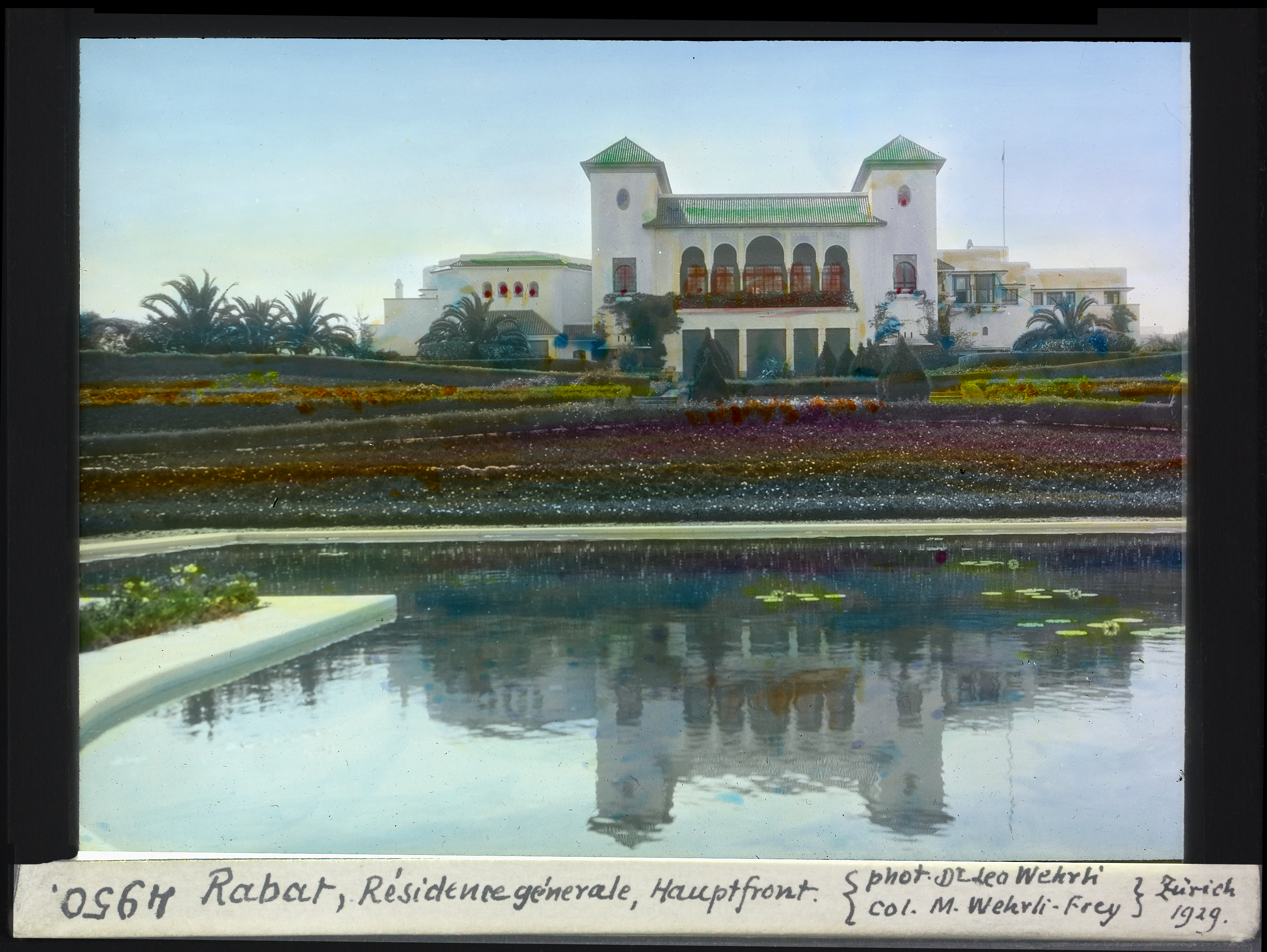
French Protectorate Residence, Rabat, 1929 postcard

The Treaty of Fes, which officially established the Protectorate on 30 March 1912

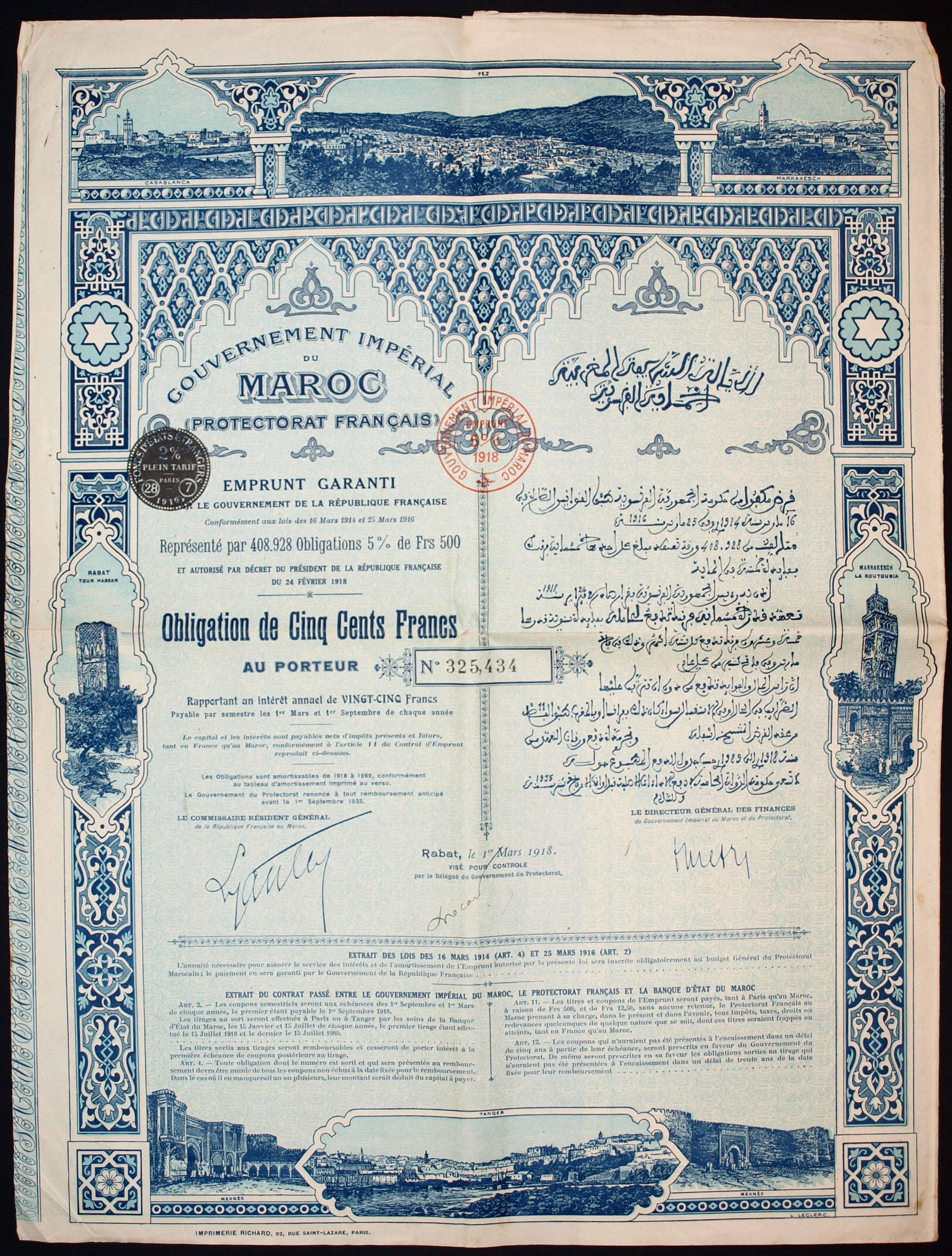
Bond of the French protectorate Morocco, issued 1 March 1918

Spanish Morocco in pink (northern zone and Cape Juby), French Morocco in light green, Spain and colonies in red, French colonies in dark green.

France officially established a protectorate over Morocco with the Treaty of Fes, ending what remained of the country's de facto independence. From a legal point of view, the treaty gave the legislative power to France, alongside the control of military defense, foreign policy and jurisdiction. The Moorish government exercised authority solely in Moroccan or Islamic affairs. Sultan Abdelhafid abdicated in favour of his brother Yusef after signing the treaty. On 17 April 1912, Moroccan infantrymen mutinied in the French garrison in Fez, in the 1912 Fes riots The Moroccans were unable to take control of the city and were defeated by a French relief force. In late May 1912, Moroccan forces again unsuccessfully attacked the enhanced French garrison at Fez.

In establishing their protectorate over much of Morocco, the French had put behind them the experience of the conquest of Algeria and of their protectorate over Tunisia; they took the latter as the model for their Moroccan policy. There were, however, important differences. First, the protectorate was established only two years before the outbreak of World War I, which brought with it a new attitude toward colonial rule. Rejecting the typical French assimilationist approach to culture and education as a liberal fantasy, Morocco's conservative French rulers attempted to use urban planning and colonial education to prevent cultural mixing and to uphold the traditional society upon which the French depended for collaboration. Second, Morocco had a thousand-year tradition of independence and had never been subjected to Ottoman rule, though it had been strongly influenced by the civilization of Muslim Iberia.

Morocco was also unique among North African countries in possessing a coast on the Atlantic, in the rights that various nations derived from the Conference of Algeciras, and in the privileges that their diplomatic missions had acquired in Tangier (including a French legation). Thus the northern tenth of the country, with both Atlantic and Mediterranean coasts, were excluded from the French-controlled area and treated as a Spanish protectorate.

Although being under protectorate, Morocco retained -de jure- its personality as a state in international law, according to an International Court of Justice statement, and thus remained a sovereign state, without discontinuity between pre-colonial and modern entities. In fact, the French enjoyed much larger powers.

Under the protectorate, French civil servants allied themselves with the French colonists and with their supporters in France to prevent any moves in the direction of Moroccan autonomy. As pacification proceeded, the French government promoted economic development, particularly the exploitation of Morocco’s mineral wealth, the creation of a modern transportation system, and the development of a modern agriculture sector geared to the French market. Tens of thousands of colonists entered Morocco and bought up large amounts of the rich agricultural land. Interest groups that formed among these elements continually pressured France to increase its control over Morocco.

==== World War I ====
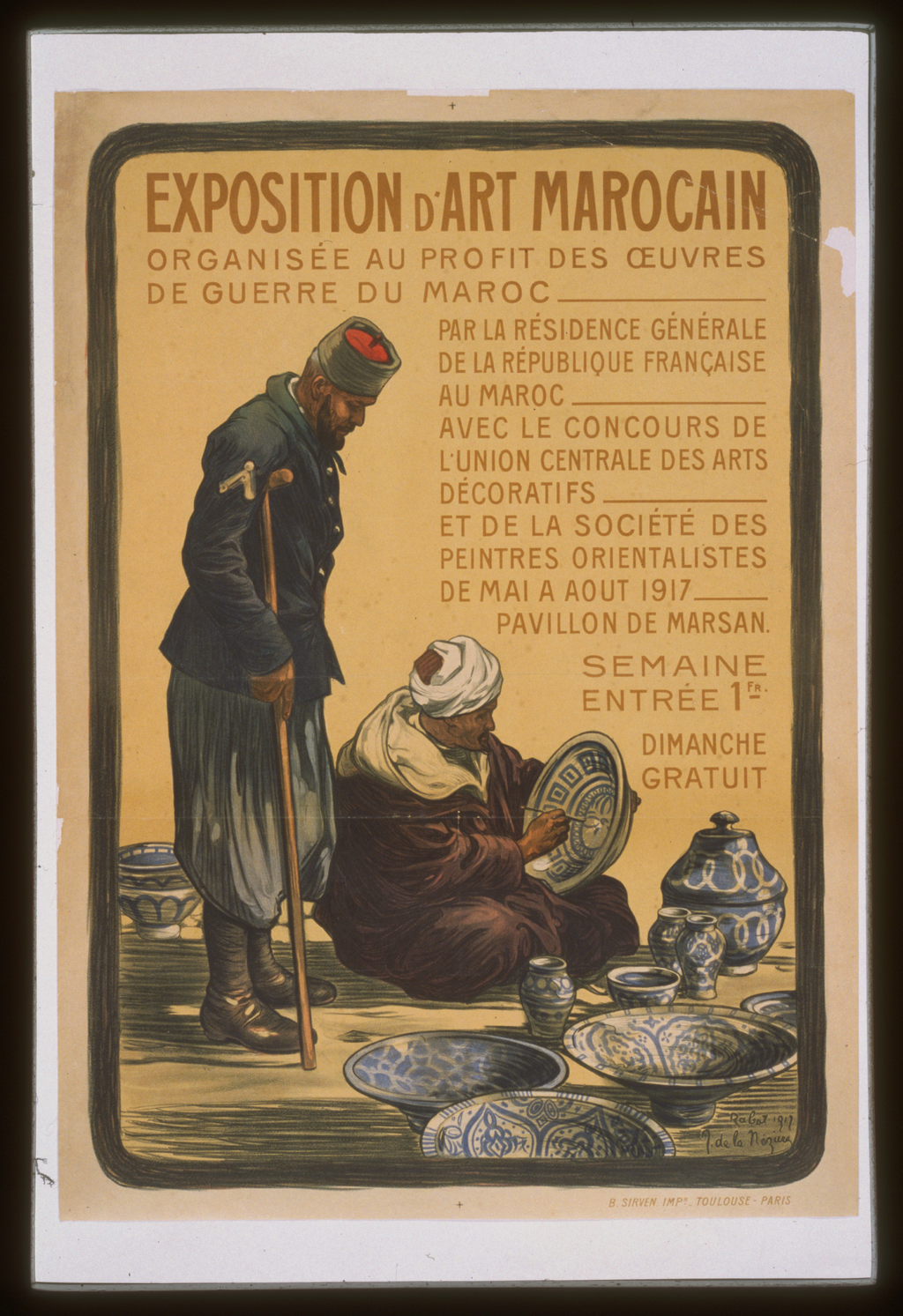
An advertisement for an art exhibition for the benefit of troops wounded serving France during WWI, featuring anOrientalist painting by Joseph de La Nézière.

France recruited infantry from Morocco to join its troupes coloniales, as it did in its other colonies in Africa and Asia. Throughout World War I, a total of 37,300–45,000 Moroccans fought for France, forming a "Moroccan Brigade." Moroccan colonial troops first served France in the First Battle of the Marne, September 1914, and participated in every major battle in the war, including in Artois, Champagne, and Verdun. Historians have called these Moroccan soldiers "heroes without glory" as they are not and have not been given the consideration they merited through valor and sacrifice during the war. Brahim El Kadiri Boutchich identified the participation of Moroccan soldiers in the service of France in WWI as "one of the most important moments in the shared history of Morocco and France."

==== Lyautey and the Protectorate (1912–1925) ====
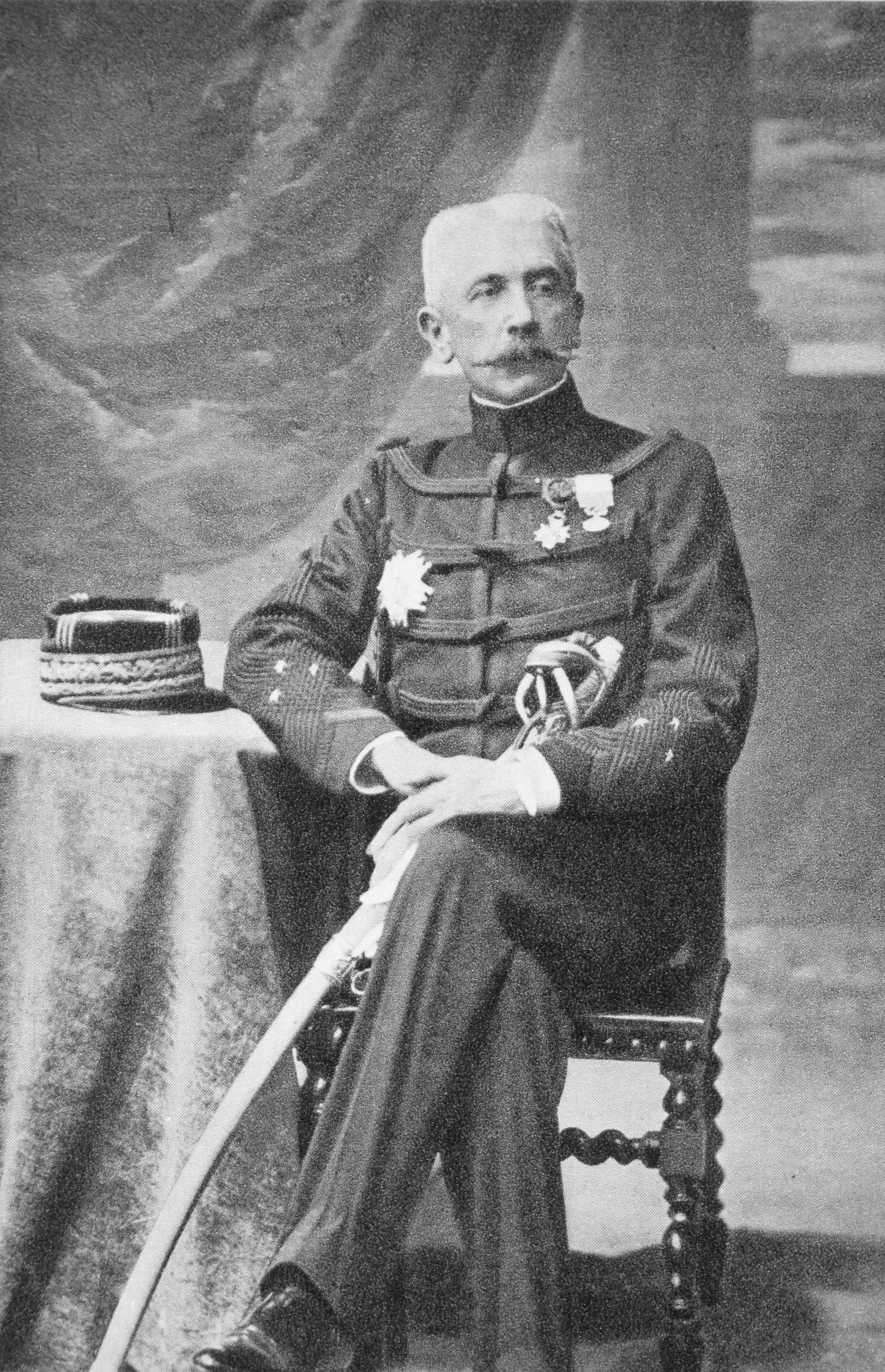
Marshal Lyautey, first resident general of French Morocco. He represented French colonial interests while also upholding the authority of the sultan.

Hubert Lyautey, the first Resident-General of the Protectorate, was an idealistic yet pragmatic leader with royalist leanings, who made it his mission to develop Morocco in every sector under French influence. Unlike his compatriots, Lyautey didn't believe that France should directly annex Morocco like French Algeria, but rather remodel and re-educate Moroccan society. He promised that, in this process, he would:

...offend no tradition, change no custom, and remind ourselves that in all human society there is a ruling class, born to rule, without which nothing can be done...[we] enlist the ruling class in our service...and the country will be pacified, and at far less cost and with greater certainty than by all the military expeditions we could send there...

Lyautey's vision was ideological: A powerful, pro-French, Westernized monarchy that would work with France and look to France for culture and aid. Unlike in Algeria, where the entire nobility and government had been displaced, the Moroccan nobility was included in Lyautey's plans. He worked with them, offering support and building elite private schools to which they could send their children; one notable attendee of these schools was Thami El Glaoui.

During the protectorate period, the Sultans of Morocco (Alawi dynasty) retained their powers, both nominal and practical: The Sultans issued decrees in their own names and seal, and they remained the religious leaders of Morocco. They were further allowed an all-Arab court. Lyautey once said this:

In Morocco, there is only one government, the sharifian government, protected by the French.

Walter Burton Harris, a British journalist who wrote extensively on Morocco, commented upon French preservation of traditional Moroccan society:

At the Moroccan court, scarcely a European is to be seen, and to the native who arrives at the Capital [sic] there is little or no visible change from what he and his ancestors saw in the past.

Lyautey served his post until 1925, during the middle of the failed revolt of the Republic of the Rif against Franco-Spanish administration and the Sultan.

== Opposition to French control ==
=== Zaian War ===
The Zaian confederation of Berber tribes in Morocco fought a war of opposition against the French between 1914 and 1921. Resident-General Louis-Hubert Lyautey sought to extend French influence eastwards through the Middle Atlas mountains towards French Algeria. This was opposed by the Zaians, led by Mouha ou Hammou Zayani. The war began well for the French, who quickly took the key towns of Taza and Khénifra. Despite the loss of their base at Khénifra, the Zaians inflicted heavy losses on the French.

With the outbreak of the First World War, France withdrew troops for service in Europe, and they lost more than 600 in the Battle of El Herri. Over the following four years, the French retained most of their territory despite the Central Powers' intelligence and financial support to the Zaian Confederation and continual raids and skirmishes reducing scarce French manpower.

After Armistice with Germany in November 1918, significant forces of tribesmen remained opposed to French rule. The French resumed their offensive in the Khénifra area in 1920, establishing a series of blockhouses to limit the Zaians' freedom of movement. They conducted negotiations with Hammou's sons, persuading three of them, along with many of their followers, to submit to the French rule. A split in the Zaian Confederation between those who supported submission and those still opposed led to infighting and the death of Hammou in Spring 1921. The French responded with a strong, three-pronged attack into the Middle Atlas that pacified the area. Some tribesmen, led by Moha ou Said, fled to the High Atlas and continued a guerrilla war against the French well into the 1930s.

=== Rif War ===
Flag of the Rif Republic (1921–1926)

Sultan Yusef's reign, which lasted from 1912 to 1927, was turbulent and marked with frequent uprisings against Spain and France. The most serious of these was a Berber uprising in the Rif Mountains, led by Abd el-Krim, who managed to establish a republic in the Rif. Though this rebellion began in the Spanish-controlled area in the north, it reached the French-controlled area. A coalition of France and Spain finally defeated the rebels in 1925. To ensure their own safety, the French moved the court from Fez to Rabat, which has served as the capital ever since.

=== Nationalist parties ===
Amid the backlash against the Berber Decree of 16 May 1930, crowds gathered in protest and a national network was established to resist the legislation. Dr. Susan Gilson Miller cites this as the "seedbed out of which the embryonic nationalist movement emerged." In December 1934, a small group of nationalists, members of the newly formed Moroccan Action Committee (كتلة العمل الوطني, Comité d’Action Marocaine – CAM), proposed a Plan of Reforms (برنامج الإصلاحات المغربية) that called for a return to indirect rule as envisaged by the Treaty of Fes, admission of Moroccans to government positions, and establishment of representative councils. The moderate tactics used by the CAM to obtain consideration of reform included petitions, newspaper editorials, and personal appeals to French.

=== World War II ===
During World War II, the badly divided nationalist movement became more cohesive, and informed Moroccans dared to consider the real possibility of political change in the post-war era. The Moroccan Nationalist Movement (الحركة الوطنية المغربية) was emboldened by overtures made by Franklin D. Roosevelt and the United States during the 1943 Anfa Conference during World War II, expressing support for Moroccan independence after the war. Nationalist political parties based their arguments for Moroccan independence on such World War II declarations as the Atlantic Charter.

However, the nationalists were disappointed in their belief that the Allied victory in Morocco would pave the way for independence. In January 1944, the Istiqlal Party, which subsequently provided most of the leadership for the nationalist movement, released a manifesto demanding full independence, national reunification, and a democratic constitution. Sultan Muhammad V approved the manifesto before its submission to the French resident general Gabriel Puaux, who answered that no basic change in the protectorate status was being considered.

=== Struggle to regain Moroccan independence ===
Through transnational activism and diplomacy, Moroccan nationalists globalized the Moroccan question. In doing this they created a global coalition of supporters who advocated their cause and projected their concerns globally. Among their active international supporters was Robert E. Rodes who participated in efforts to gain support for Moroccan independence in the US Congress.

During the late 1940s and early 1950s, with political and nonviolent efforts proving futile, the Moroccan struggle to regain independence became increasingly violent, with massacres, bombings, and riots (particularly in the industrial center of Casablanca).

==== Tangier Speech and Casablanca Tirailleurs Massacre ====
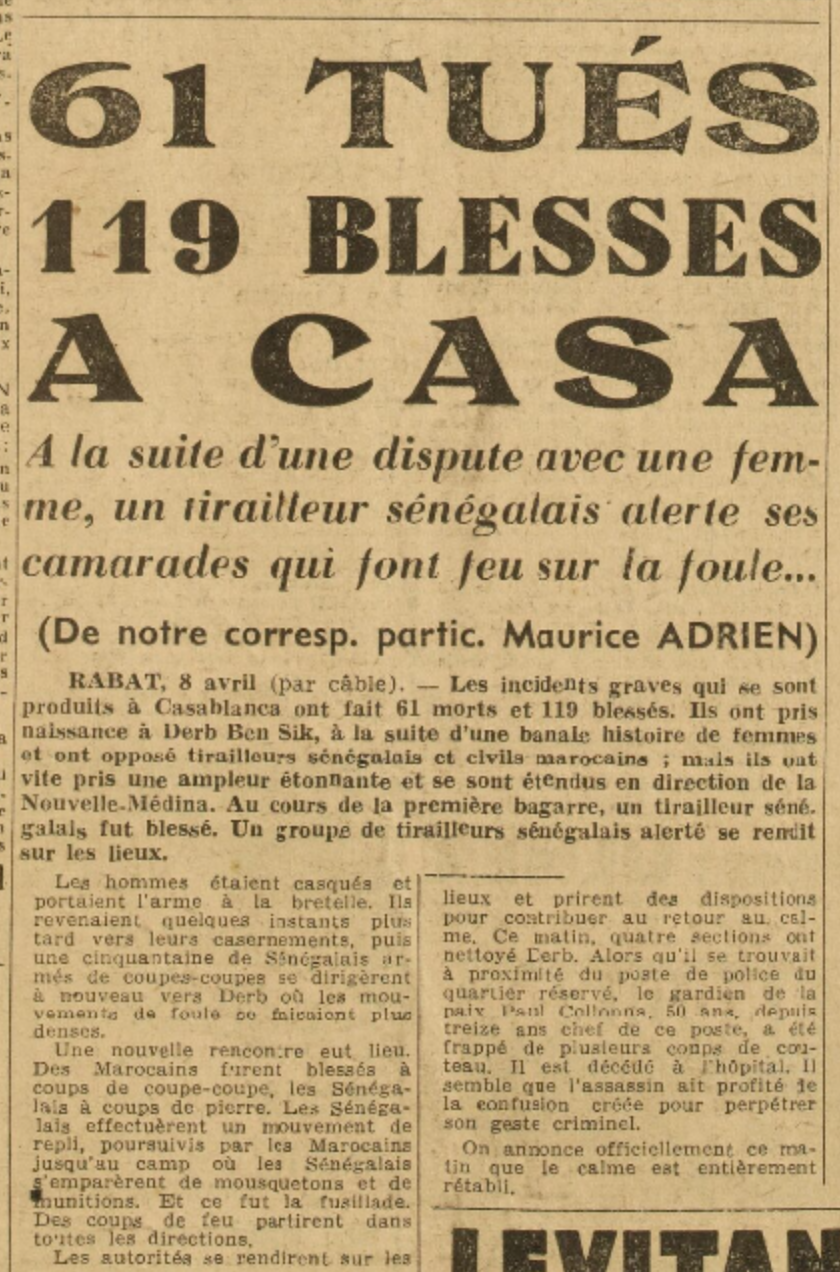
The Massacre of April 7, 1947 in Casablanca as reported in France-Soir on April 9.

In 1947, Sultan Muhammad V planned to deliver a speech in what was then the Tangier International Zone to appeal for his country's independence from colonialism and for its territorial unity.

In the days leading to Mohammed V's speech, French colonial forces in Casablanca, specifically Senegalese Tirailleurs serving the French colonial empire, carried out a massacre of working class Moroccans. The massacre occurred on 7–8 April 1947, as the tirailleurs fired randomly into residential buildings in working-class neighborhoods, killing 180 Moroccan civilians. The conflict was instigated in an attempt to sabotage the Sultan's journey to Tangier, though after having returned to Casablanca to comfort the families of the victims, the Sultan then proceeded to Tangier to deliver the historic speech, in the garden of the Mendoubia palace, on 9 April.

==== Murder of Farhat Hached ====
The assassination of the Tunisian labor unionist Farhat Hached by La Main Rouge—the clandestine militant wing of French intelligence—sparked protests in cities around the world and riots in Casablanca from 7–8 December 1952. Approximately 100 people were killed. In the aftermath of the riots, French authorities arrested Abbas Messaadi, who would eventually escape, found the Moroccan Liberation Army, and join the armed resistance in the Rif.

=== Revolution of the King and the People ===
==== Glaoui's attempted coup ====
In 1953, Thami El Glaoui attempted to orchestrate a coup against Sultan Muhammad V with the support of the French protectorate. The 1953 Oujda revolt broke out ten days after his "electoral" campaign passed through the city.

==== Exile of Sultan Muhammad ====
The general sympathy of the sultan for the nationalists had become evident by the end of the war, although he still hoped to see complete independence achieved gradually. By contrast, the residency, supported by French economic interests and vigorously backed by most of the colonists, adamantly refused to consider even reforms short of independence. Official intransigence contributed to increased animosity between the nationalists and the colonists and gradually widened the split between the sultan and the resident general.

Muhammad V and his family were transferred to Madagascar in January 1954. His replacement by the unpopular Mohammed Ben Aarafa, whose reign was perceived as illegitimate, sparked active opposition to the French protectorate both from nationalists and those who saw the sultan as a religious leader. By 1955, Ben Aarafa was pressured to abdicate. Consequently, Ben Aarafa fled to Tangier where he formally abdicated.

The French executed 6 Moroccan nationalists in Casablanca on 4 January 1955. The aggressions between the colonists and the nationalists increased from 19 August – 5 November 1955, and approximately 1,000 people died.

Facing a united Moroccan demand for the sultan’s return, a rising violence in Morocco, as well as the deteriorating situation in Algeria, Muhammad V returned from exile on 16 November 1955, and declared independence on 18 November 1955. In February 1956 he successfully negotiated with France to enforce the independence of Morocco, and on 14 August 1957 took the title of King.

==== 1956 independence ====
In late 1955, Muhammad V successfully negotiated the gradual restoration of Moroccan independence within a framework of French-Moroccan interdependence. Further negotiations for full independence culminated in the French-Moroccan Agreement signed in Paris on 2 March 1956.

However, provisions in the protocole annexe of the March agreement as well the Cooperation Agreement of 28 May 1956, which stipulated among other things that each country should refrain from adopting policies that were incompatible with the interests of the other, constituted an impediment to full independence, as was the right of France to maintain troops in Morocco during a transitional period of unspecified duration. The outspoken support of the Moroccans and Muhammad V for Algerian independence brought about the rapid collapse of these agreements and the worsening of Franco-Moroccan relations, especially after the Meknès riots of 23–28 November 1956 in the course of which several hundred Moroccans and more than 50 Europeans were killed. From a high of 350,000 in 1955, the number of European settlers dropped to 150,549 in 1963, and 25,343 in 1990. French-ownership of agricultural land was gradually eliminated following the nationalization decrees of 1959, 1963 and 1973. Following unrelenting diplomatic pressure by Morocco, the last French troops were finally withdrawn 1 November 1961.

The internationalized city of Tangier was reintegrated with the signing of the Tangier Protocol on 29 October 1956. The abolition of the Spanish protectorate and the recognition of Moroccan independence by Spain were negotiated separately and made final in the Joint Declaration of 7 April 1956. Through these agreements with Spain in 1956 and 1958, Moroccan control over certain Spanish-ruled areas was restored, though attempts to claim other Spanish possessions through military action were less successful.

In the months that followed independence, Muhammad V proceeded to build a modern governmental structure under a constitutional monarchy in which the sultan would exercise an active political role. He acted cautiously, having no intention of permitting more radical elements in the nationalist movement to overthrow the established order. He was also intent on preventing the Istiqlal Party from consolidating its control and establishing a one-party state. In August 1957, Muhammad V assumed the title of king.

== Economic exploitation ==
French colonialism in Morocco was discriminatory against native Moroccons and highly detrimental to the Moroccan economy. Moroccans were treated as second class citizens and discriminated against in all aspects of colonial life. Infrastructure was discriminatory in colonial Morocco. The French colonial government built 36.5 kilometers of sewers in the new neighborhoods created to accommodate new French settlers while only 4.3 kilometers of sewers were built in indigenous Moroccan communities. Additionally, land in Morocco was far more expensive for Moroccans than for French settlers. For example, while the average Moroccan had a plot of land 50 times smaller than their French settler counterparts, Moroccans were forced to pay 24% more per hectare. Moroccans were additionally prohibited from buying land from French settlers.

Colonial Morocco’s economy was designed to benefit French businesses at the detriment of Moroccan laborers. Morocco was forced to import all of its goods from France despite higher costs. Additionally, improvements to agriculture and irrigation systems in Morocco exclusively benefited colonial agriculturalists while leaving Moroccan farms at a technological disadvantage. It is estimated that French colonial policies resulted in 95% of Morocco’s trade deficit by 1950.

=== Agriculture ===
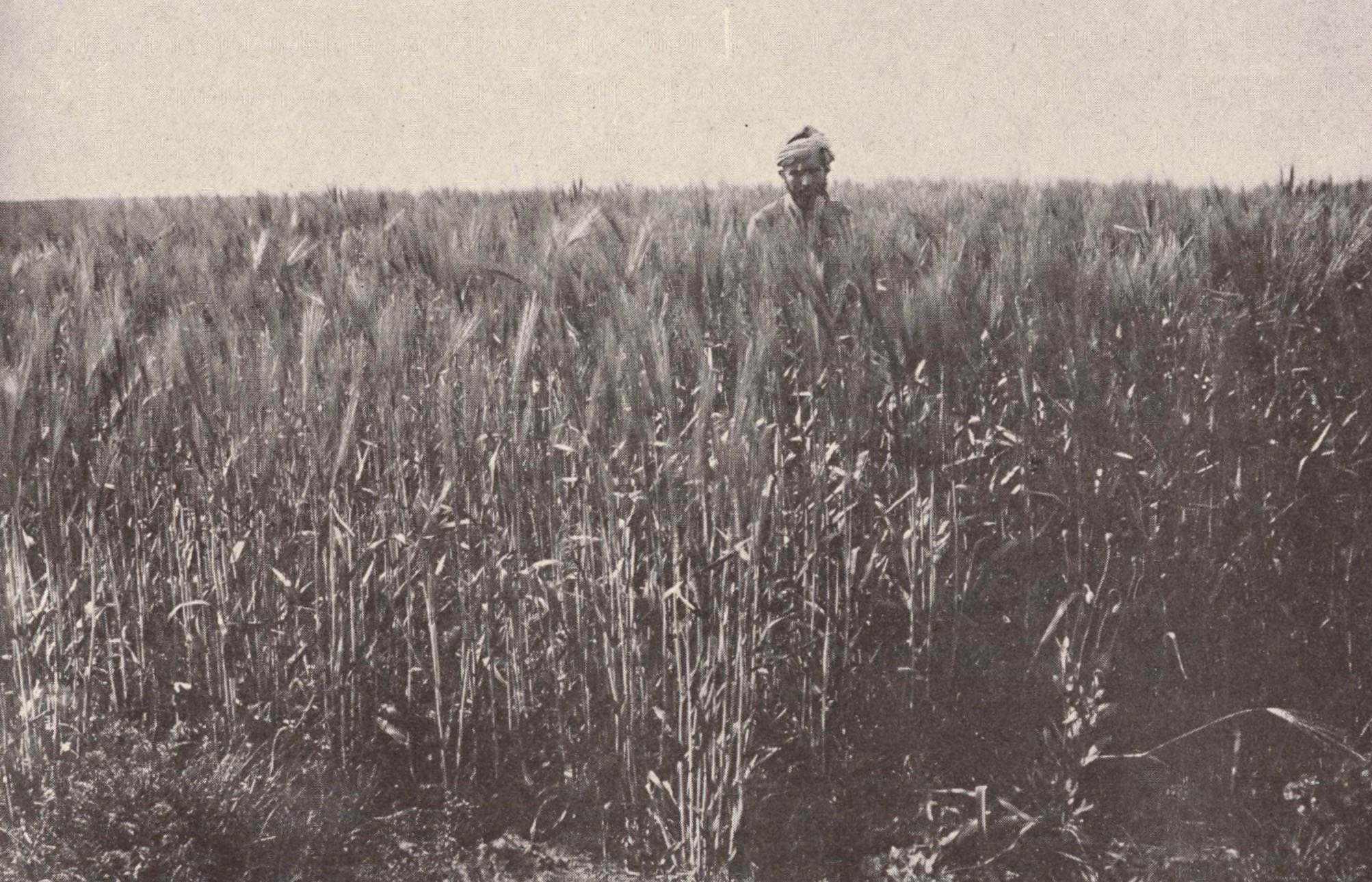
A farmer in a field of barley in the Chaouia, published 15 August 1917 in the magazine France-Maroc

Learning from experiences in Algeria, where imprudent land appropriation, as Professor Susan Gilson Miller puts it, "reduced much of the native peasantry to a rootless proletariat," Lyautey solicited a select group of 692 "gentlemen-farmers"—instead of what he called the "riff-raff" of southern Europe—capable of serving as "examples" to les indigènes and imparting French influence in the rural colonization of Morocco from 1917 to 1925. The objective was to secure a steady supply of grain for Metropolitan France and to transform Morocco once again into the "granary of Rome" by planting cereals primarily in the regions of Chaouia, Gharb, and Hawz—despite the fact that the region is prone to drought. After a period of minimal profits and a massive locust swarm in 1930, agricultural production shifted toward irrigated, higher-value crops such as citrus fruits and vegetables. The industrialization of agriculture required capital that many Moroccan farmers did not have, leading to a rural exodus as many headed to find work in the city.

=== Infrastructure ===
Roadmap of Morocco in 1919

The Compagnie franco-espagnole du chemin de fer de Tanger à Fez built a standard gauge railroad connecting Fes and Tangier, while Compagnie des chemins de fer du Maroc (CFM) built standard gauge railways connecting Casablanca, Kenitra, and Sidi Kacem, and Casablanca and Marrakech, completed in 1928. Compagnie des Chemins de Fer du Maroc Oriental created narrow-gauge railroads east of Fes.

La Compagnie de Transports au Maroc (CTM) was founded in 30 November 1919 with the goal of accessing "all of Morocco." Its services ran along a new colonial road system planned with the aim of linking all major towns and cities. It continues to offer intercity bus services nationwide.

=== Natural resources ===
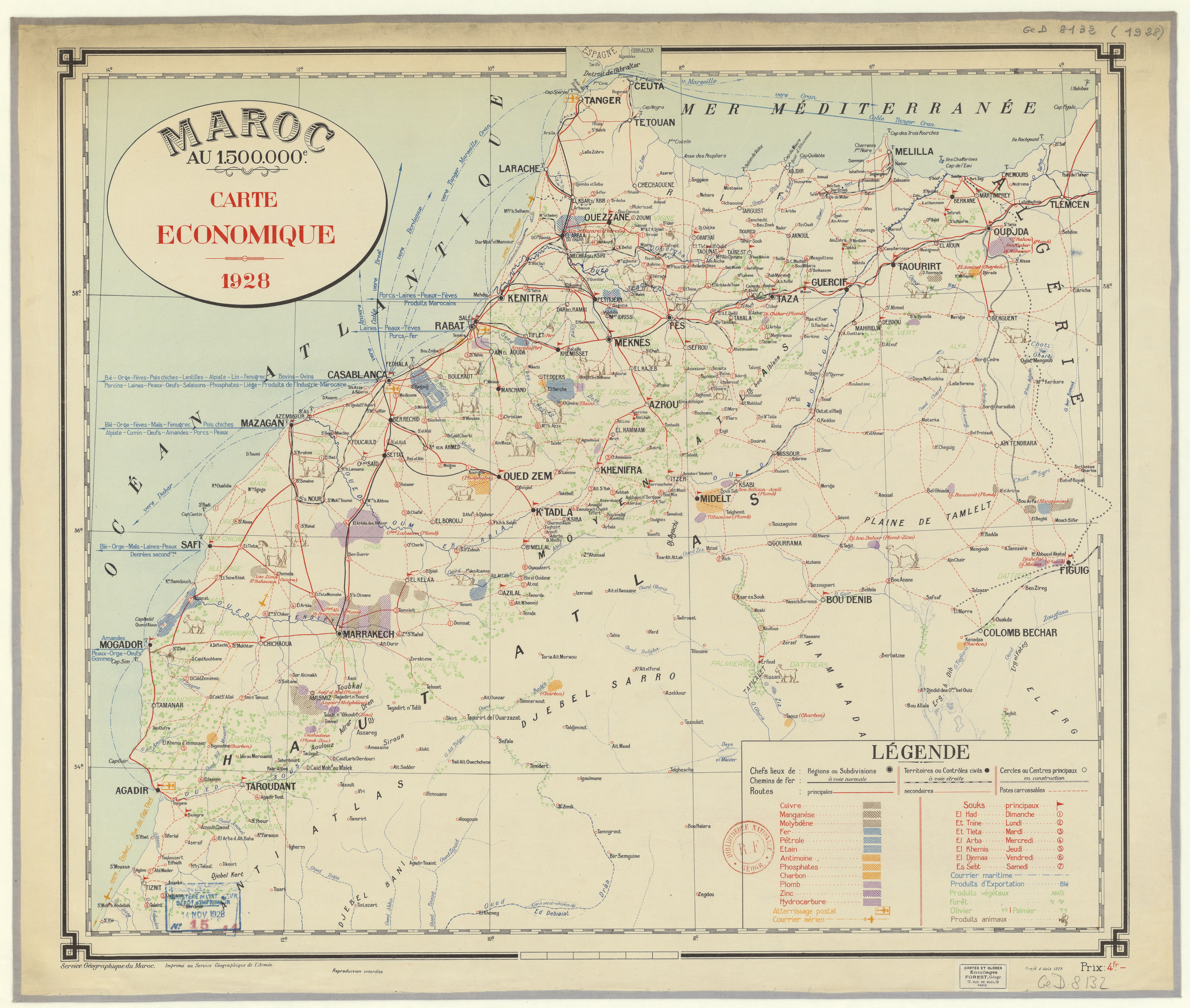
An economic map of Morocco produced by the French protectorate in 1928

The Office Chérifien des Phosphates (OCP) was created in 1920 to mine phosphates out of Khouribga, which was connected to the Port of Casablanca by a direct rail line. In 1921, 39,000 tons of phosphate were extracted, while almost 2 million tons were extracted in 1930. The Moroccan laborers working in the mines did not benefit from any social protections, were forbidden from unionizing, and earned a tiny fraction of what Europeans earned.

=== Industry ===
Industry during the early period of the protectorate focused on food processing for local consumption: there were canneries, a sugar refinery (Compagnie Sucriere Marocaine, COSUMA), a brewing company (Société des Brasseries du Maroc, SBM), and flour mills. Manufacturing and heavy industry, however, were not embraced for fears of competing with Metropolitan France.

=== Monetary policy ===
The French minted coinage for use in the Protectorate from 1921 until 1956, which continued to circulate until a new currency was introduced. The French minted coins with denomination of francs, which were divided into 100 centimes. This was replaced in 1960 with the reintroduction of the dirham Morocco's current currency.

The Algeciras Conference gave concessions to the European bankers, ranging from a newly formed State Bank of Morocco, to issuing banknotes backed by gold, with a 40-year term. The new state bank was to act as Morocco's Central Bank, but with a strict cap on the spending of the Sherifian Empire, with administrators appointed by the national banks that guaranteed the loans: the German Empire, United Kingdom, France and Spain.

== Repression ==
Hubert Lyautey established the Native Policy Council (Conseil de politique indigène) which oversaw colonial rule in the protectorate. Under the protectorate, Moroccans were prevented from attending large political gatherings. This was because colonial forces deemed they might "hear things beyond their capacity to understand."

French authorities also forbade Arabic-language newspapers from covering politics, which sparked claims of censorship. Under the French protectorate, entire articles were censored from the Istiqlal Party's Arabic Al-Alam newspaper, which was printed with blocks of missing text.

== Postal history ==
A French postal agency had sent mail from Tangier as early as 1854. However, the formal beginning of the system was in 1892, when the Sultan of Morocco Hassan established the first organized state owned postal service called Sharifan post, by opening several post offices throughout the country. This initiative aimed to limit the foreign or local private postal services. After the establishment of the protectorate in 1912, the offices issued postage stamps of France surcharged with values in pesetas and centimos, at a 1–1 ratio with the denominations in French currency, using both the Type Sage issues, and after 1902, Mouflon issue inscribed "MAROC" (which were never officially issued without the surcharge). In 1911, the Mouflon designs were overprinted in Arabic.

The first stamps of the protectorate appeared 1 August 1914, and were just the existing stamps with the additional overprint reading "PROTECTORAT FRANCAIS". The first new designs were in an issue of 1917, consisting of 17 stamps in six designs, denominated in centimes and francs, and inscribed "MAROC".

== Railways ==
Morocco had from 1912–1935 one of the largest 600 mm (1 ft 11 5/8 in) gauge networks in Africa with total length of more than 1,700 kilometres. After the treaty of Algeciras, the representatives of Great Powers agreed not to build any standard gauge railway in Morocco until the standard gauge Tangier–Fez Railway was completed. The French had begun to build military 600 mm (1 ft 11 5/8 in) gauge lines in their part of Morocco.

== Legacy ==
French colonialism had a lasting impact on society, economy, language, culture, and education in Morocco. There are also lingering connections that have been described as neocolonial. As a francophone former colony of France in Africa, Morocco falls into the cadre of Françafrique and la Francophonie. In 2019, 35% of Moroccans speak French—more than Algeria at 33%, and Mauritania at 13%.

There are approximately 1,514,000 Moroccans in France, representing the largest community of Moroccans outside of Morocco. The INSEE announced that there are approximately 755,400 Moroccan nationals residing in France as of October 2019, representing 20% of France's immigrant population.

The former Residence-general, designed for Lyautey by architect Albert Laprade and completed in 1924, is now the seat of the Moroccan Ministry of Interior.

== See also ==
- French conquest of Morocco
- List of French residents-general in Morocco
- Spanish protectorate in Morocco
- History of Morocco
- France–Morocco relations
- French protectorate of Tunisia
- French Algeria
- List of French possessions and colonies
