= Hafidiya =

Coup in pre-colonial Morocco, 1907–1908

The Hafidiya الحفيظية
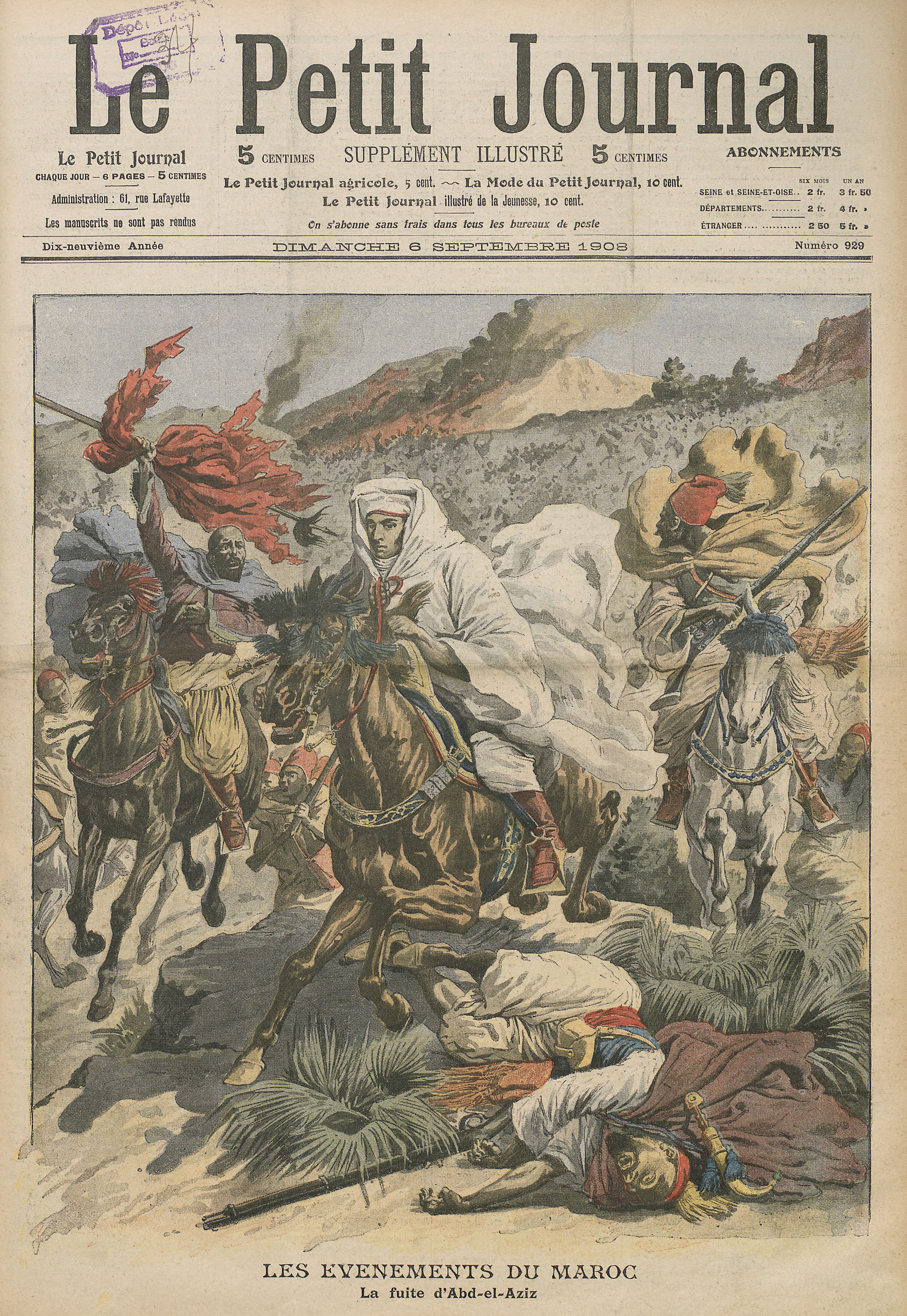
- Sultan Abd al-Aziz fleeing from the Battle of Marrakesh
Date	1907–1908
Location	Morocco
Result	Coup successful: End of rule of Abd al-Aziz; Abd al-Hafid pronounced sultan of Morocco

Belligerents
Sultan's forces	Abd al-Hafid's forces

Commanders and leaders
Abd al-Aziz; Abu Shata al-Baghdadi	Abd al-Hafid; Muhammad wuld Mawlay al-Rashid; Madani al-Glawi

Strength
7,000 initially falling to 100	3,000 initially peaking at 36,000

Casualties and losses
- About 1000 killed

The Hafidiya (Arabic: الحفيظية, romanized: al-Ḥafīẓīya) was a coup d'état (Note: Cultural historian Edward Berenson categorises it as "part jihad, part national rebellion, part anticolonial struggle and part agrarian uprising".) in Morocco between 1907 and 1908 in which Abd al-Hafid seized power from his brother Abd al-Aziz. Abd al-Hafid started his movement in Marrakesh in the aftermath of the Algeciras Conference, the French occupation of Oujda and of Casablanca and the gaining the support of Amazigh leaders in the south. The Ulama of Fes supported Abdelhafid only with an unprecedented Conditioned Bay'ah, or pledge of allegiance.

== Background ==
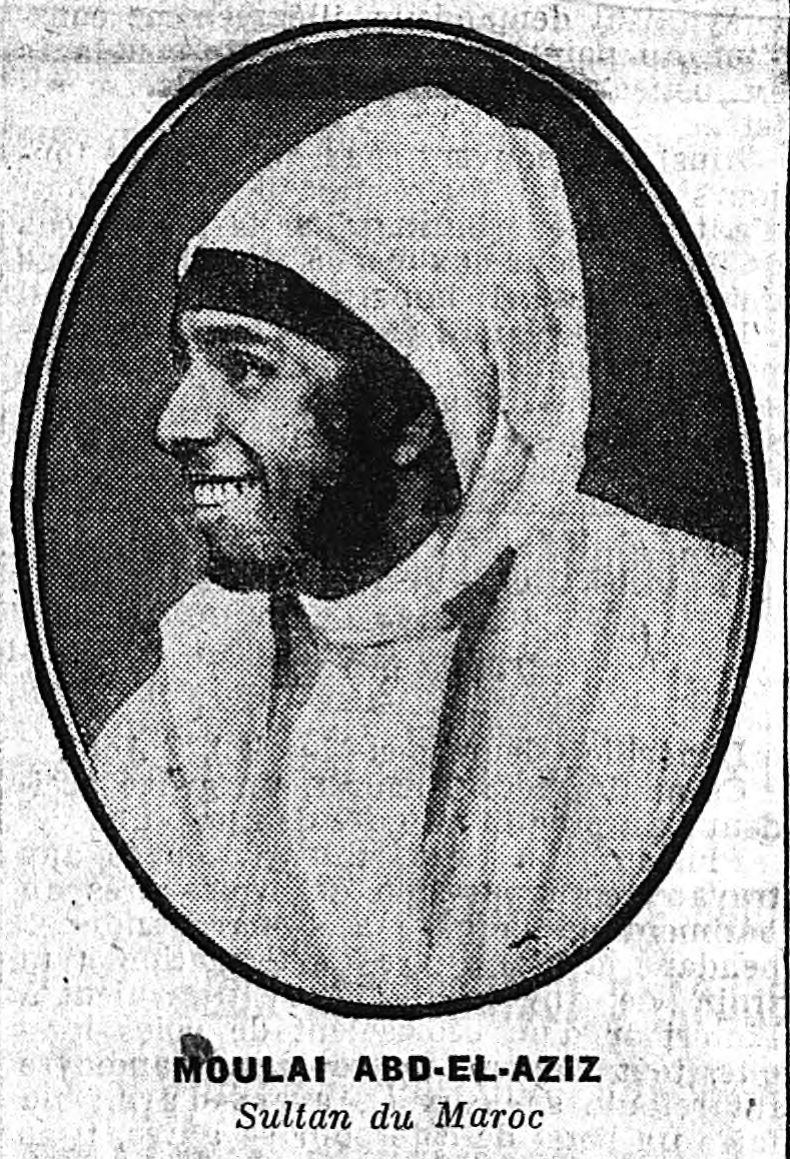
Abd al-Aziz

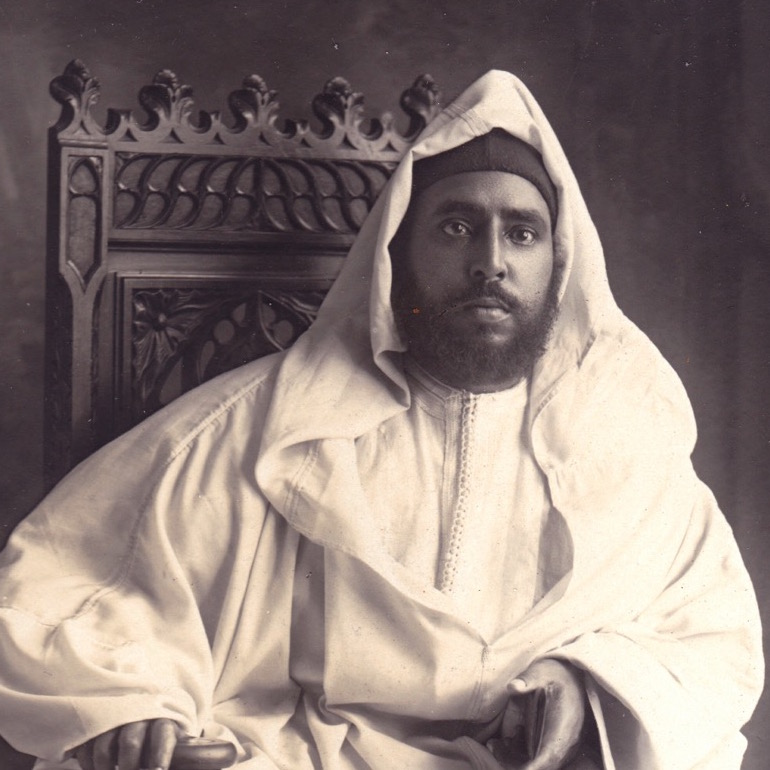
Abd al-Hafid

While Mawlay Muhammad was initially set to succeed Hassan I, his younger son, Abd al-Aziz, was instead designated heir shortly before Hassan's death. This was partly due to the support of Hassan's favourite wife, Lalla Ruqaya and the grand vizier Ba Ahmed. Furthermore, Muhammad was supposedly seen as a poor commander and half-hearted Muslim while Abd al-Aziz was Hassan's favourite. Abd al-Aziz's ascension was unpopular in Morocco with the ulama reluctantly giving him the bayʿah with some favouring his brothers Mawlay Bilgith and Mawlay Muhammad. Due to Abd al-Aziz's young age, Ba Ahmed served as de facto regent until his death in 1900. As regent, Ba Ahmed attempted to maintain Hassan's previous policies. However, under him, the legitimacy of the regime was compromised and the economic situation worsened. Furthermore, Morocco was not in a good international position with Ba Ahmed's policies failing in the eastern frontier with Algeria.

When Abd al-Aziz took power, he embarked on a policy of reform and hoped to break from the past politically and personally. However, his policy of reform ended up in failure. A number of factors generated an unpopular reputation. These include his scandalous and controversial public behaviour in a society where public gestures were extremely important, the loss of Touat to France, the implementation of the unpopular tartib tax and his overindulgence in European inventions and customs. One particularly controversial event was when Abd al-Aziz ordered the execution of a tribesman who murdered a European. This tribesman took refuge in the shrine of Mawlay Idris which he was supposed to be under the protection of. Much of the ulama had a connection to Mawlay Idris and they saw this as a sacrilege against the spiritual authority of the shrine. As a result of this violation, a former makhzan official, Jilali al-Zarhuni, decided to began a revolt in north east Morocco among the tribe of Ghiata. He claimed to be the brother of Abd al-Aziz, Mawlay Muhammad, and declared a jihad against Abd al-Aziz.

Due to pressure from the French, Abd al-Aziz's makhzan called for an international conference at Algeciras in 1906. This was first suggested by the majlis al-a‘yān (lit. 'council of notables') that Abd al-Aziz established. The makhzan sought to internationalise the Moroccan question as they believed it could ward off French predominance. Ultimately, the Algeciras Conference ended up being a French success and a Moroccan failure. To the horror of Moroccans, French influence grew as an international control body dominated by France was established. The ratification of Algeciras solidified the break between Abd al-Aziz and pro-resistance Moroccans. Anti-French and Anti-European feeling were exacerbated and some concluded that at that point, the solution was the overthrow of Abd al-Aziz. The Algeciras Conference of 1906 had the effect of dividing Moroccans into supporters of either the Sultan Abd al-Aziz or his brother Abd al-Hafid into those calling for reform for jihad, respectively. Anti-European attacks gradually increased with the most significant being the murder of Émile Mauchamp which resulted in the occupation of Oujda. Abd al-Aziz blamed Moroccans for this which bolstered his opposition. On 30 July 1907, Chaouia tribesmen attacked Europeans in Casablanca which prompted the French to land a military force in Casablanca. This kickstarted the Chaouia campaign.

== Course ==
=== Beginnings of the conspiracy ===
According to Alfred Georges Paul Martin, the origins of the Hafidiya date back to 1904, growing out of several meetings between Abd al-Hafid and Madani al-Glawi. During these talks, they discussed the deteriorating political situation and projects they could undertake to assure the "security of Islam".

=== Proclamation ===
In May 1907, after France had occupied Oujda, the southern aristocrats, led by the head of the Glaoua tribe, Madani al-Glawi, invited Abd al-Hafid, an elder brother of Abd al-Aziz and viceroy at Marrakesh, to become sultan, and on August 16, 1907, after the bombardment and occupation of Casablanca, Abdelhafid was proclaimed sovereign in Marrakesh with all of the usual formalities.

In September, Abd al-Aziz arrived at Rabat from Fez and endeavoured to secure the support of the European powers against his brother. From France, he accepted the grand cordon of the Légion d’honneur and was later enabled to negotiate a loan. That was seen as leaning to Christianity and aroused further opposition to his rule.

=== Conditioned Bay'ah ===
In January 1908, the Ulama of Fes led by Muhammad al-Kattani declared Abd al-Aziz deposed and they imposed a conditioned bay'ah on Abd al-Hafid. The conditions for support included him to resume jihad, liberate Oujda and Casablanca, end the protégé system, restrict Europeans to port cities and consult the ummah in all major decisions.

=== Battle of Marrakesh ===
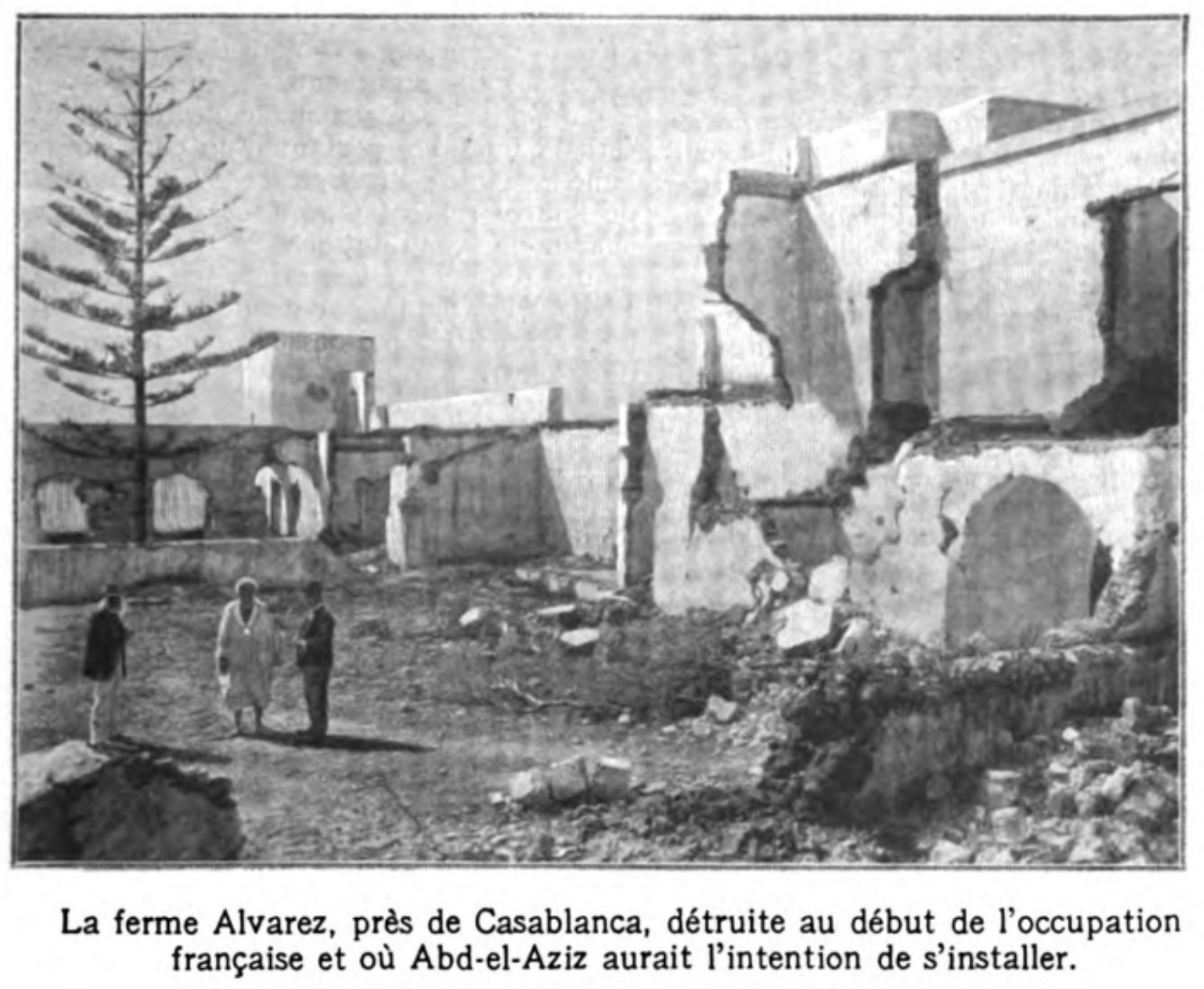
Abd al-Aziz planned to stay at the Álvarez Farm near Casablanca, but it was destroyed at the beginning of the French occupation.

The Battle of Marrakech took place on August 19, 1908, when supporters of Abd al-Hafid destroyed the mahalla of Abd al-Aziz on the road from Rabat to Marrakesh. Abd al-Aziz fled to Casablanca, then occupied by the French.

== Press ==
The French Arabic-language propaganda newspaper Es-Saada supported Abd al-Aziz and attacked supporters of Abd al-Hafid, including Ma al-'Aynayn and Muhammad Bin Abd al-Kabir al-Kattani. With French encouragement, supporters of Abd al-Aziz founded as-Sabaah (الصباح) in Tangier in 1904.

In early 1908, Abd al-Hafid's Makhzen purchased Lisan al-Maghrib (لسان المغرب), an arabophone newspaper; it was run by two Lebanese brothers, Faraj-Allah and Artur Namor, and it printed open letters to Abd al-Aziz and then Abd al-Hafid.

In 1908, Abd al-Hafid ordered the creation of the newspaper al-Fajar (الفجر), which would promote his views. It published its first edition on June 27, 1908.

The British press, or more specifically the London Times considered Abd al-Hafid's efforts to be a lost cause due to a number of military failures in May 1908. This was prior to al-Hafid's fortunes being reversed through the Battle of Marrakech.

== Aftermath ==
The countries signatory to the Treaty of Algeciras informed Abd-al-Hafid in a letter dated September 14, 1908 that they would not recognize him as the legitimate head of Morocco unless he complied with the terms of the treaty signed by his predecessor.

== Sources ==
- Burke III, Edmund (1976). Prelude to Protectorate in Morocco: Pre-Colonial Protest and Resistance, 1860-1912. University of Chicago Press. ISBN 978-0-226-08084-0.
- Pennell, C. R. (2000). Morocco Since 1830: A History. Hurst. ISBN 978-1-85065-273-1.
