= Lissan-ul-Maghreb =

Moroccan newspaper

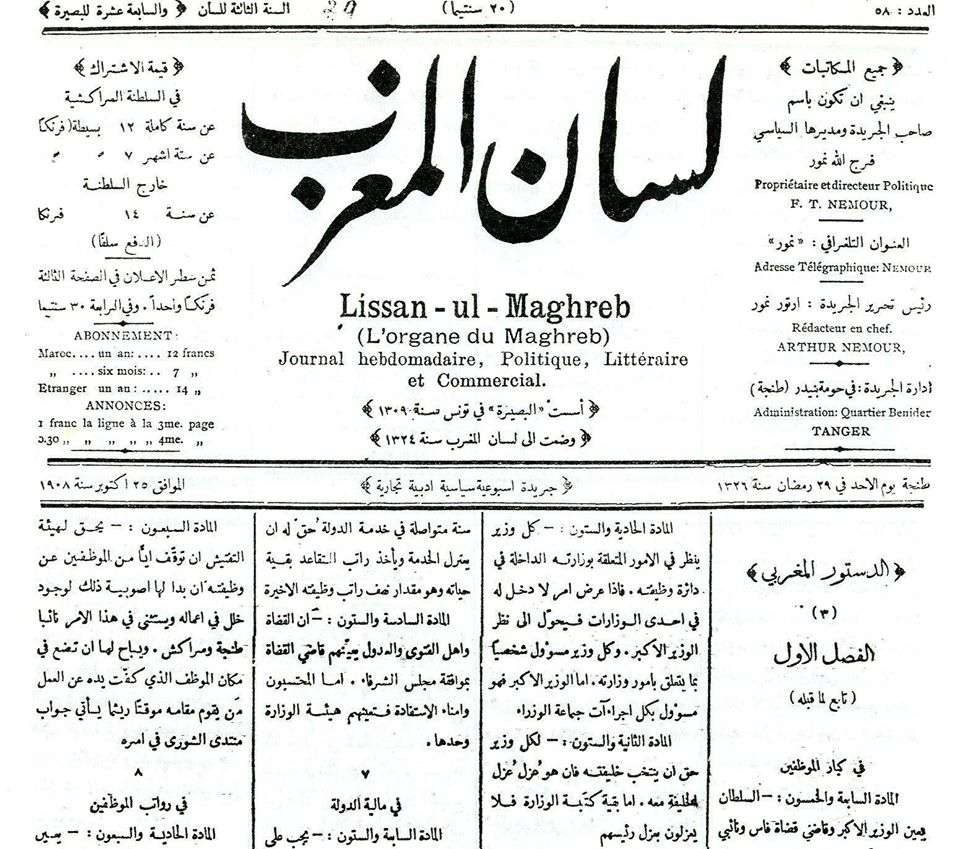

Lissan-ul-Maghreb (Arabic: لِسَانُ المَغرِب) was a Moroccan arabophone newspaper established in Tangier in 1907. It was founded by two Lebanese brothers, Faraj-Allah Namor and Artur Namor. It famously printed the 1908 draft constitution, as well as open letters to Abdelaziz and then Abd al-Hafid.

== History ==
Lissan-ul-Maghreb was founded in 1907 by two Lebanese brothers, Faraj-Allah Namor (فرج االله بن ســليم نمّور), a literary man born in Sidon in 1865, and his brother Artur Namor, a gifted journalist. They had traveled to Europe, Morocco, South America, Tripoli, Tunis, Paris, and London before arriving in Tangier January 1906 in search of work, hoping to establish an Arabic publication. The German consulate in Tangier was eager to found an arabophone publication to support German interests in Morocco, and from it the Namor brothers received the necessary support. They sourced all necessary furnishings from the Catholic Press in Beirut (المطبعة الكاثوليكية للآباء اليســوعيين في بيروت). The first issue of Lissan-ul-Maghreb was published February 8, 1907. It was an arabophone weekly newspaper consisting of four pages, with Faraj-Allah as the political director and Artus as the editor-in-chief.

With French encouragement, supporters of Abdelaziz founded as-Sabaah (الصباح) in Tangier in 1904. At the time of the Hafidiya (1907–1908), the fratricidal struggle between Abdelaziz and Abdelhafid for the Moroccan throne, the French arabophone newspaper Es-Saada supported Abdelaziz. Lissan-ul-Maghreb printed open letters to Abdelaziz and then Abd al-Hafid.

In the Lissan-ul-Maghreb issue of February 14, 1908, the newspaper confirmed the sale of the newspaper to the Makhzen of Sultan Abdelhafid and that the editors would be working for him. In the months following the signature of the sale, things proceeded well, but after about a year, the Makhzen did not uphold its financial responsibilities and the Namor brothers began to publish defamatory content on the Makhzen, criticizing the state on all fronts.

In 1908, Abd al-Hafid ordered the creation of the newspaper al-Fajar (الفجر), first appearing on June 27, 1908, which would promote his views.
