= Muhammad ibn Ja'far al-Kattani =

Muḥammad ibn Ja'far al-Kattānī
- محمد بن جعفر بن إدريس الكتاني
- Born: 1858; Fes, Morocco
- Died: 19 March 1927 (aged 68–69); Fes, Morocco
- Occupations: Historian and Scholar
- Children: Idris al-Kettani

Muḥammad ibn Jaʿfar ibn Idrīs al-Kattānī (Arabic: محمد بن جعفر بن إدريس الكتاني), born in Fes in 1858 and died in Fes in 1927 was a Moroccan scholar and theologian from the 19th century.

== Bibliography ==
Al-Kattānī came from a family of Islamic scholars in Fes, the Kattānīyya brotherhood, strongly marked by the religious tradition of Ibn Arabi. His father, Ja'far bin Idris, was Shaykh al-Islām and advisor to Sultan Hassan ben Mohammed (from 1873 to 1894). He devoted his first works to Islamic jurisprudence and local history, writing in particular an imposing historical-biographical dictionary of local personalities, the Salwat al-anfās, which inspired many similar works elsewhere in the Maghreb.

Opposed to the French occupation of Morocco, he denounced the compromises of Sultan Abd al-Hafid and settled in Medina in 1907, then part of the Ottoman Empire, where he met intellectuals from all over the Muslim world. He returned to Morocco to join the revolt of the Sultan's brother, a movement supported by his cousin Mohamed bin Abd al-Kabir al-Kattani. After the failure of this uprising, he returned to Medina in 1910.

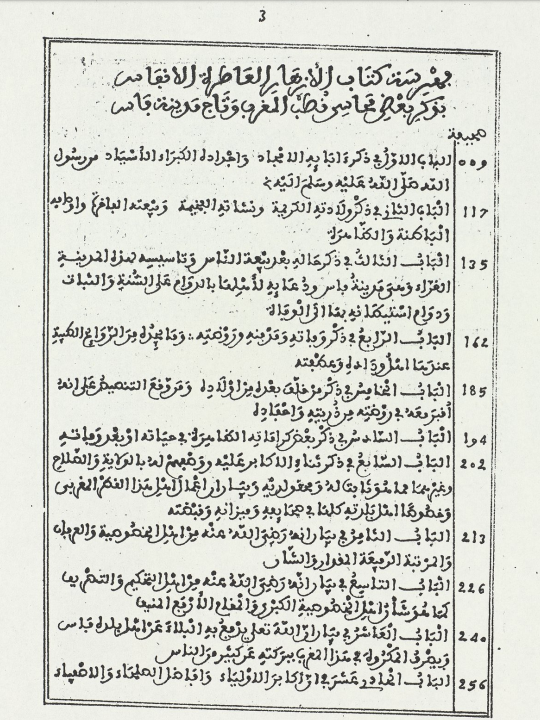
Table of contents of al- Azhār al-ʻāṭirat al-anfās bi-dhikr baʻḍ maḥāshin quṭb al-Maghrib wa-tāj madīnat Fās, printed in Fes on a lithographic press in the late 19th century.

In uncertain circumstances, he left to settle in Damascus. After the First World War, he took part in the struggles against the French mandate and, while remaining faithful, took an interest in pan-Islamism and the renewal of Islam, the only means, according to him, to allow Muslims to free themselves from the Christians. He contacted Emir Ahmed Sharif al-Senussi, who encouraged him to fight against the colonisers. A French report from 1923 notes: “Sheik Kattani began by recruiting members in all the major Syrian centers. Most of the 'ulama' in Syrian cities have joined the sect and have led, ipso facto, to the great Muslim religious and philanthropic societies whose influence over the masses are unquestionable.". He also supported the revolts of the Sennusids against the Italian occupation of Libya.

At the end of his life, he returned to Morocco where he was taught at the University of al-Qarawiyyin.

== Works ==
His best known book is the famous Saints from Fes (Salwa al-Anfās), or Kitāb salwat al-anfās wa-muḥadatha al-akiyas mi-man uqbira min al-ʿulamā wa al-ṣulaḥa bi-Fās, lithographed Arabic edition originally 1898.

He also wrote al- Azhār al-ʻāṭirat al-anfās bi-dhikr baʻḍ maḥāsin quṭb al-Maghrib wa-tāj madīnat Fās (الأزهار العاطرة الأنفاس بذكر بعض محاسن قطب المغرب وتاج مدينة فاس).

He also wrote “Naẓm al-Mutanāthir min al-Ḥadīth al-Mutawātir” (نظم المتناثر من الحديث المتواتر).
