= Es-Saada =

Es-Saada السعادة
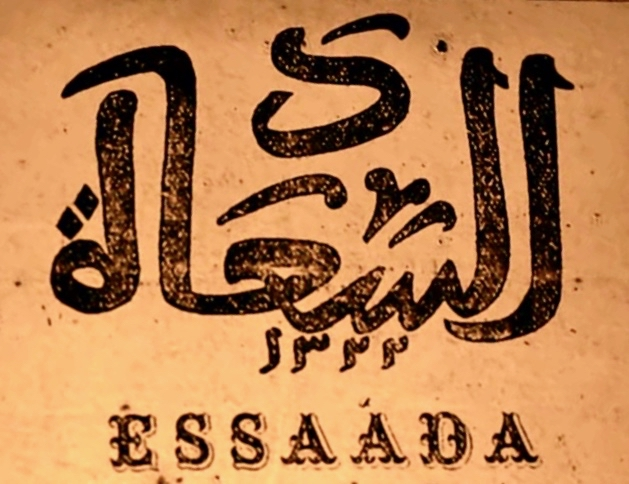
- Type: Weekly newspaper
- Launched: November 7, 1904
- Ceased publication: December 27, 1956
- Language: Arabic
- Headquarters: Tangier 1904-1913; Rabat 1913-

es-Saada (Note: also romanized as Essaada, Al-saʿāda, Al-saʿādah, Al-saʿādaẗ, etc.) (السعادة Happiness; November 7, 1904 - December 27, 1956) was an Arabic weekly newspaper published in Morocco that served as the mouthpiece of the French government. The newspaper was financed by France, originally printed at the French Legation in Tangier, and used as a tool with which to spread French ideas among Moroccans. It reached all cities of Greater Morocco. Its content has been described as distinctively colonial and disruptive of public opinion in Morocco.

== History ==
When the newspaper was launched in 1904, its editor was an Algerian, named Idriss Khubzawi.

Commenting on the Tangier Crisis of 1905, es-Saada published:

"لا شك أن هاته الاتفاقية الفرنساوية الألمانية قد كشفت قناع المسألة المغربية وأزالت جميع العقبات التي كانت سابقا في وجه الدولة الفرنساوية حيث تحصلت بحسن سياسة وزير خارجيتها وخبرته بالأمور الحكمية على اعتراف دولة الألمان بجميع حقوقها في المغرب ومما يتعلق به كالمعاهدات العتيقة"
"There is no doubt that this French-German Treaty has exposed the Moroccan question and removed all barriers that had previously stood before the French state, as it has acquired—thanks to its foreign minister's good politics and experience in governance—recognition from the German state of all of France's rights in Morocco and what pertains to that, such as old treaties."

es-Saada was first published at the French Legation in Tangier, then it moved to Rabat in 1913.

=== Wadii' Karam ===
==== Attacks on the Ulama of Fes ====
The newspaper's editorial line took a more radical turn when Wadii' Karam (وديع كرم), a Maronite man from Greater Syria, was appointed editor-in-chief in 1906. His editorial line took aim at the Sufi Ulama of Fes after their pledge of allegiance to Abd al-Hafid. An article published on January 15, 1908 described the Ulama of Fes as "renegade revolutionary heretics."

Es-Saada published over 20 articles on the leader of the Kettani Sufi Order and the architect of Fes's conditional allegiance to Abdelhafid in 1908—Muhammad Bin Abd al-Kabiir al-Kettani—and his family and followers. The newspaper pushed the idea that the Sufi sheikh sought to overthrow the monarchy, and lusted after the sultan's power.

"المخزن كان نافرا من الكتاني تيقنا منه أن الرجل لا يقصد من وراء ورده الأمور الدينية وإنما له غاية أخرى يجللها بثوب الدين، ولذلك لم يحتفل به المخزن كما ينبغي ولا راعى شأنه كما يستحق. المخزن نفسه عارف ما يبطنه الكتاني وما تنطوي عليه نيته من الوثوب على الملك، وما له من المكانة في قلوب البربر."
"The Makhzen turned away from al-Kettani, understanding that the man's intention is not to bring up religious matters but that he has an ulterior motive that he dresses in religion. In this regard, the Makhzen did not watch him enough, nor did it surveil his case enough. The Makhzen itself knows what al-Kettani is hiding and knows his intention to pounce on the king and his place in the hearts of the Berbers."

Leaders of the Islamic establishment in Fes tried to block the newspaper, which they termed ash-Shaqaawa (الشقاوة Wretchedness), from entering the city. On January 30, 1908, Le Rappel reported that a council of Fesi ulama declared the prohibition of es-Saada in Fes and that its editor, Wadii' Karam, needed to be punished in an exemplary way.

Notables of Fes also published articles refuting ideas in es-Saada and did not hesitate to call out Wadii' Karam by name. They included al-Jaish al-'Aramram li Hazm Wadii' Karam (الجيش العرمرم لهزم وديع كرم The Vigorous Forces to Defeat Wadii' Karam), 24 pages printed anonymously on Fes's lithograph press in 1908, and Sinan al-Qalam li Tanbiih Wadii' Karam (سنان القلم لتنبيه وديع كرم The Quill Tip to Alert Wadii' Karam), a political journal published by Muhammad al-'Aabid Bin Ahmad Bin Suda.

==== Attacks on Ma al-'Aynayn ====
Karam's es-Saada also carried out an extensive character assassination campaign against Sheikh Ma’ al-‘Ainain by calling into question the qaid and spiritual leader’s patriotism and religious devotion and by describing him as an unscrupulous mendicant and arms smuggler, even peddling rumors that his followers were Shii'a.

On Ma’ al-‘Ainain es-Saada published:

"عاد شيخ الصحراء إلى دسائسه المفطور عليها، فقام بما هايج من الخواطر يوم مروره بالشواطئ البحرية عند رجوعه إلى مقره، ولم يقنع بما ناله من الأموال وحاز من الهدايا، بل أرسل الآن ولده إلى فاس يتظاهر أمام المخزن باستعداد أبيه لحماية المخزن وإخراج الإفرنسيين من وجدة"
"The sheikh of the Sahara has returned to his old tricks; he stirred up memories when he, discontent with the money he made and the gifts he got passing by the coast on his return to his base, sent his son to Fes to appear before the Makhzen, appealing with his father’s readiness to protect the Makhzen and oust the French from Oujda."

and:

"لم يكن إشفاق المولى عبد العزيز على هذا الشيخ ولا أكرمه سخاء على حاشيته وأتباعه فمازلنا نتذكر الأنعام العديدة التي حباه بها في العام الماضي والذنوب الكبيرة التي تحمل المخون مسؤوليتها يوم مروره بالدار البيضاء وكيف كانت العمال تقاد إلى طاعة الشيخ صاغرة كالنعاج لدى الراعي والأمناء تتسابق للتبريك …حاملة الهدايا والدراهم، والشيخ يهزأ بالمخزن ويضحك عليه"
"Abdelaziz had no compassion for the sheikh, nor did he honor him for the sake of his entourage and supporters. We still remember the gifts bestowed upon him last year, and the great wrongs the day the ungrateful sheikh passed through Casablanca, and how the laborers were made to submit to him, supplicating like sheep around a shepherd while their managers jostled to bless him, bearing gifts and money. The sheikh mocks the Makhzen and laughs at it."

=== Under French Protectorate ===
With the establishment of the French Protectorate, Resident General Hubert Lyautey moved es-Saada to Rabat October 1913, and it became the official mouthpiece of the French colonial government in Morocco. It was located at avenue Delcassé. Lyautey provided ample funding and support and appointed a French Arabist, named Eugene Marco [?] (أوجين ماركو), as the director.

The newspaper was soon eclipsed in importance by l'Echo du Maroc.
