= Finance in Morocco =

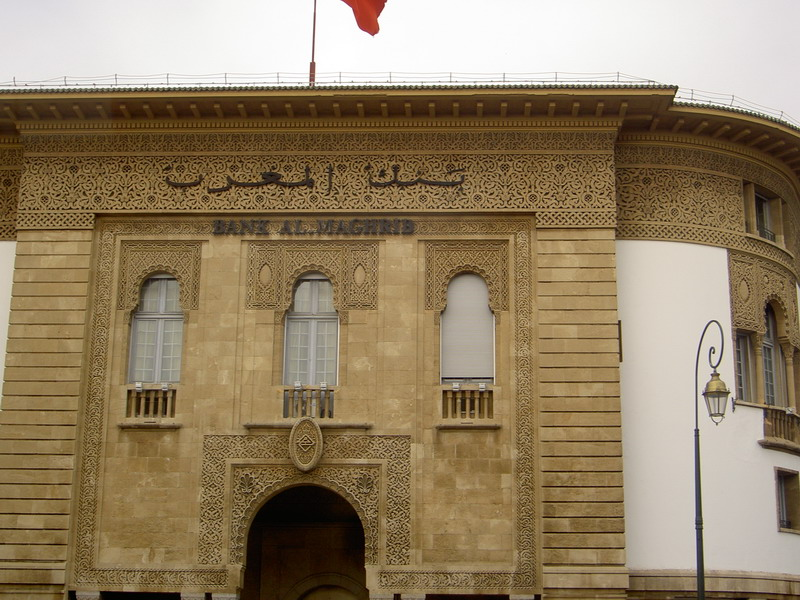
The central bank of Morocco (Bank Al Maghrib)

In 2007, the financial sector of Morocco maintained an economic environment conducive to further growth of banking activity following a very good year for the sector in 2006. Morocco's banks have been largely unaffected by the credit crisis due to their limited connection to global financial markets. The number of people with a bank account increased from 25% in 2007 to 29% in 2008, while deposits rose by 11.1% to a record Dh572.3bn (€51.5bn), 20% of which belong to Moroccan nationals living abroad. Private banks are increasingly moving towards universal banking, buying companies in all segments of the financial industry. While GDP advanced 5.6% in 2008, outstanding loans jumped 23% to a record Dh519.3bn (€46.74bn) as more people bought and furnished property. As the rest of the world saw lending dry up, Moroccan banks issued more loans, showing 2.6% growth in the first five months of 2009.

Morocco has also made progress in financial inclusion. According to the World Bank's financial inclusion database, Global Findex 2021, the percent of adults with an account at a financial institution or through a mobile money provider went from 29% in 2017 to 44% in 2021.

== Banking ==
In 2007, macroeconomic growth, excluding the agricultural sector, remained quite robust, providing the background for dynamic growth in banking credits. Total assets of the banking sector increased by 21.6% to MAD 654.7bn ($85.1bn), which is above the previous year's high annual growth rate of 18.1%. The structure of the domestic sector has remained steady in the past two years, with the landscape dominated by three major local banks. The state has started to remove itself from the domestic sector by surrendering part of its share capital in public banks. At end-2007 public capital still held controlling stakes in five banks and four financing companies. Meanwhile, foreign ownership in the local financial sector continues to grow, with foreign institutions controlling five banks and eight financing companies as well as holding significant stakes in four banks and three financing companies. The introduction of additional Islamic banking products is also likely in the future.

The financial system, though robust, has to take on excessive quantities of low risk-low return government debt at the expense of riskier, but more productive private sector lending. This crowding–out of private sector investment reduces the profitability and growth incentives of the financial sector.

Fitch Ratings affirmed Morocco's long-term local and foreign issuer default ratings of "BBB−" and "BBB", respectively, with a stable outlook. The credit rating agency attributed its classification in part to the "relative resilience of Morocco's economy to the global economic downturn."

== Insurance ==
The insurance sector in Morocco is witnessing dynamic growth, driven foremost by developments in life insurance, which has superseded motor insurance in the past two years as the leading segment of the market with around one-third of total premiums. Behind life and auto insurance, accident, work-related accident, fire and transport insurance were the largest contributors. Total premiums reached Dh17.7bn ($2.3bn) in 2007, ranking Morocco as one of the largest insurance markets in the Arab world behind Saudi Arabia and the United Arab Emirates. The insurance penetration rate is 2.87% of GDP, while the insurance density is $69 per person. More broadly, the Moroccan insurance sector is already consolidated, with five large players controlling the market. The sector is set to be opened up to foreign competition from 2010 onward, and the consolidation of insurance companies into larger entities should strengthen the local players to better compete with eventual competition from foreign insurers. There is also the possibility that new insurance niches such as takaful (Islamic insurance) and microinsurance products will become part of the Moroccan market in the medium-term, but they are unlikely to appear in the near future.

== Bank Al-Maghrib ==
The Central Bank of Morocco, Bank Al-Maghrib, was granted enhanced autonomy in 2006. The bank, which follows the dual policy of controlling inflation and promoting growth, seems to be doing a good job. Morocco has largely had low levels of inflation. In 2006, its annual inflation was only 2.7%. The central bank plays a preeminent role in the country's banking system. It issues the Moroccan dirham, maintains Morocco's foreign currency reserves, controls the credit supply, oversees the government's specialized lending organizations, and regulates the commercial banking industry.

== Market capitalisation ==
In 2007, the capitalisation of the Moroccan stock market increased by 40.5% to Dh586.3bn ($76.2bn), up from the Dh417.1bn ($54.2bn) recorded the previous year. This substantial jump is largely attributed to the 10 new share issues on the Casablanca Stock Exchange over the course of the year, as well as the several secondary issues that also took place in 2007. The market capitalisation-to-GDP ratio also moved in step with the upward trend, now accounting for 96.5% of GDP, up from 71.1% of GDP in 2006, and is comparable to the ratios characteristic of many developed Western economies. The major industrial leaders of the market are banking, telecoms and real estate, which together make up almost two-thirds of market capitalisation. The volume of activity on the stock market, including shares and bonds, also increased significantly in 2007, reaching Dh359.7bn ($46.8bn), an increase of 161.1% on 2006, when total volumes amounted to Dh166.4bn ($21.6bn). There is a widespread belief among market professionals that the market capitalisation and trading volumes will probably continue their upward trend, supported by a positive macroeconomic background, and the latest technology developments, such as on-line securities trading, and the potential introduction of derivatives trading. Education of the public is also seen as an important issue and despite the improvements made in recent years, there is still a need to develop a level of professionalism of operators and to make professional training courses compulsory, as they are still offered on a voluntary basis.

=== Casablanca Stock Exchange ===
Privatization has stimulated activity on the Casablanca Stock Exchange(Bourse de Casablanca) notably through trade in shares of large former state-owned operation. Founded in 1929, it is one of the oldest stock exchanges in Africa, but it came into reckoning after financial reforms in 1993, making it the third largest in Africa. The stock market capitalisation of listed companies in Morocco was valued at $75,495 billion in 2007 by the World Bank. That is an increase of 74% compared with the year 2005. Having weathered the global financial meltdown, the Casablanca Stock Exchange is stepping up to its central role of financing the Moroccan economy. Over the next few years, it seeks to double its number of listed companies and more than quadruple its number of investors.
