= Muhammad al-Kattani =

Moroccan poet and scholar (1873–1909)

ash-Sheikh al-Imam al-Ḥāj Muḥammad Bin ʿAbd al-Kabīr al-Kattani
- محمد بن عبد الكبير الكتاني
- Born: 1873; Fes, Morocco
- Died: May 4, 1909 (aged 35–36)
- Education: University of al-Qarawiyyin
- Writing career
- Notable work: Conditioned Bay'ah
- Movement: Nahda

Muḥammad Bin ʿAbd al-Kabīr al-Kattani (Arabic: محمد بن عبد الكبير الكتاني; 1873 – May 4, 1909), also known by his kunya Abū l-Fayḍ (أبو الفيض) or simply as Muhammad al-Kattani, was a Moroccan Sufi faqih (scholar of Islamic law), reformer, and poet from Fes. He is recognized as the father of the Moroccan constitution movement and the leader of the Conditioned Bay'ah of 1908. He was also vocally opposed to the metastasizing French colonial presence in Morocco, and launched at-Tā'ūn (الطاعون The Plague), the first national newspaper in Morocco. He was a member of the al-Kattani family and the Tariqa Kattania (الطريقة الكتانية), a Sufi order. He composed over 300 works, printed 27 of them, and wrote Sufi philosophical love poetry. He was accused of treason and flogged to death under Sultan Abdelhafid. His younger brother, Abdelhay al-Kattani (1884-1962) was politically his complete opposite and became a champion and principal advocate of France's colonial policies.

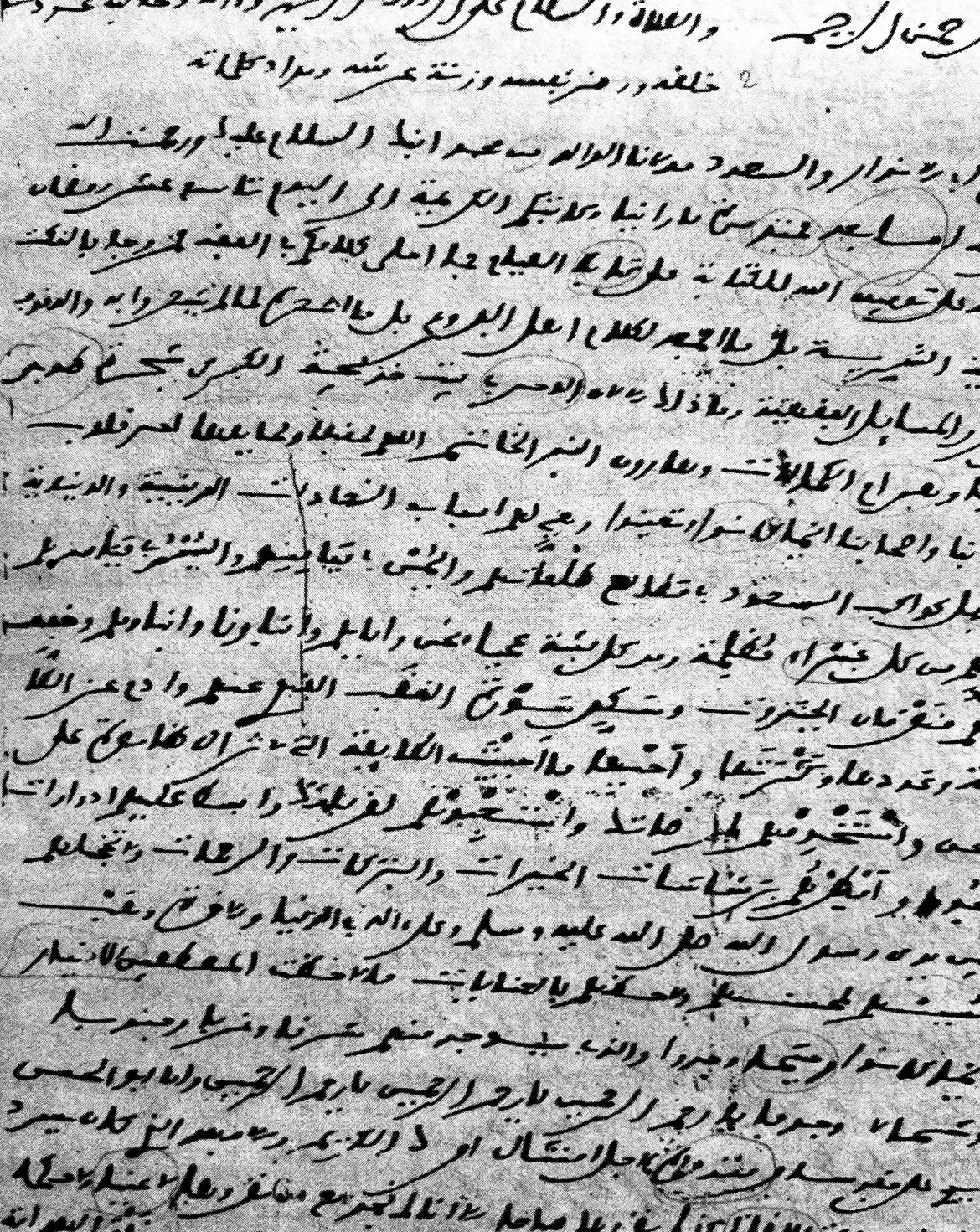
Letter from Muhammad bin Abd al-Kabir al-Kattani to his father Abd al-Kabir al-Kattani dated 14 February 1897.

== Biography ==
=== Family ===
He was born in 1873 in Fes to the illustrious al-Kattani literary family claiming Idrisid ancestry and known for its independent stance in relation to the Makhzen. His father was the polymath Abdul-Kabir al-Kattani, who was called the "Mountain of Sunna," and his grandfather was the Sheikh Abu al-Mafakhir al-Kattani. His mother was Fadila Bint Idris al-Kattaniya, a scholar of fiqh. His uncle was Muḥammad ibn Jaʿfar al-Kattānī. In 1853, the family established the Kattania Sufi order, which attracted men of different socio-economic backgrounds, but especially the working poor.

=== Education ===
Muhammad al-Kattani enrolled in a kuttab to learn the Quran, memorizing it while in his youth. He memorized works including the Hikm of Ibn Ata Allah al-Iskandari. He attended al-Qarawiyyin University and a few other schools in Fes, benefiting from the tutelage of some of the greatest scholars of his time. His father introduced him to Sufism and guided him through important Sufi texts by al-Tirmidhi, Suhrawardi, and Ibn Arabi, such as Ibn Arabi's The Meccan Revelations.

He studied hadith, biographies of the prophets, fiqh, and kalām under his maternal uncle Ja'afar bin Idriss al-Kattani. He studied Arabic grammar under Muhammad Abdullah al-Bennani, "pharaoh of syntax."

According to the hagiography al-Madhāhir (المظاهر السامية في النسبة الشريفة الكتانية), al-Kattani veiled his face, as Abu Yaaza and, in the Islamic tradition, Moses did.

His intelligence manifested itself from an early age; he began teaching while still a young man, and he preached from city to city—from Fes to Rabat to Salé, passing through Zerhoun, Meknes, and other Moroccan cities. He taught Abu Abdullah Muhammad bin Ibrahim al-Fassi of the Shadhili Sufi Order. He encouraged ijtihad, or independent thought and deliberation, and a break from taqlid, or automatic conformity. Leaders among the Ulama of Fes saw him as a threat and labeled him a heretic.

He was summoned to Marrakesh in 1896/1897 to clarify his position to Sultan Abdelaziz after a rumor spread of his ideological deviancy and his plotting of an overthrow of power. The sultan pronounced his innocence of the accusation of plotting an overthrow, and referred the case of his ideological divergence to the religious scholars. It was agreed that they and he would meet, and these meetings went on for a few months, ultimately resulting in his exoneration of what he was accused of. al-Kattani became, after these meetings, an adviser to Sultan Abdelaziz. He stayed some time in this role, then he was permitted to return to Fes.

=== Reform movement ===
In 1903, he went to Mecca to perform the Hajj. He spent some time teaching some of the scholars of the Hijaz at Great Mosque of Mecca. He also traveled through the Mashriq, visiting the Hijaz, the Levant, and Egypt, where he came into contact with important leaders and scholars, including Khedive Abbas Pasha I in Cairo and the Sharif Awn ar-Rafiq in Mecca, and called for reform in the region. al-Kattani taught many Egyptian scholars at Al-Azhar University, and met Khedive Isma'il Pasha for long talks, attempting to coordinate with him, the Ottoman Empire, and the Kingdom of Morocco to counter French imperialism. In the period of Sheikh Muhammad Bin Abdul-Kabir al-Kattani, a number of ulama from the Mashreq joined the Kattaniya Sufi order, including Ali ibn Tahir al-Watri, Abd al-Karim Murad, and Khayreddin at-Tunsi.

On his return from the East, he also visited Marseille and Naples, noting the extent of Europe's industrial, economic, and social advancement.

When he returned to Morocco in 1904/1905, he demanded a number of anti-colonial reforms. After visiting Marseille, which produced the sugarloaves imported by Morocco, he forbade his followers from drinking Moroccan tea, and encouraged them to oppose its consumption at gatherings and parties. This was an anti-colonial stance as he considered the import of tea from France to be disruptive of the Moroccan market.

It was also clear that France was preparing to occupy Morocco, and al-Kattani advised the tribes to unite, put past feuds behind them, and prepare for jihad.

=== Press ===
==== at-Tā'ūn ====
After the 1906 Algeciras Conference, the Sufi leader al-Kataani started publishing a periodical entitled at-Tā'ūn (الطاعون The Plague) in response to the colonial press and European colonialism in general.

==== Es-Saada ====
Particularly after Wadii' Karam (وديع كرم), a Maronite man from Greater Syria, was appointed editor-in-chief in 1906, the Arabic newspaper es-Saada, published by the French Legation in Tangier to advance French colonial interests, led a defamation campaign against al-Kattani and the Ulama of Fes, describing them as "renegade revolutionary heretics."

Es-Saada published over 20 articles on the leader of the al-Kattani, his family, and his followers. The newspaper pushed the idea that the al-Kattani sought to overthrow the monarchy, and lusted after the sultan's power.

"المخزن كان نافرا من الكتاني تيقنا منه أن الرجل لا يقصد من وراء ورده الأمور الدينية وإنما له غاية أخرى يجللها بثوب الدين، ولذلك لم يحتفل به المخزن كما ينبغي ولا راعى شأنه كما يستحق. المخزن نفسه عارف ما يبطنه الكتاني وما تنطوي عليه نيته من الوثوب على الملك، وما له من المكانة في قلوب البربر."
"The Makhzen turned away from al-Kettani, understanding that the man's intention is not to bring up religious matters but that he has an ulterior motive that he dresses in religion. In this regard, the Makhzen did not watch him enough, nor did it surveil his case enough. The Makhzen itself knows what al-Kettani is hiding and knows his intention to pounce on the king and his place in the hearts of the Berbers."

=== Hafidiya ===
When France invaded Oujda, bombarded Casablanca, and invaded the Shawiya in 1907, al-Kattani called for jihad and the deportation of the colonists from the country and composed numerous letters calling for resistance against the occupiers. He also signed a letter addressed to the American ambassador at the American Legation in Tangier, urging the United States not to support Abdelaziz, who took a lax stance against the French occupiers.

al-Kattani gathered the ulama of Fes and explained the situation to them. They agreed to withdraw support for Abdelaziz and to support his brother, Abdelhafid, under two main conditions: that he seek public opinion, or shura, in important decisions and that he continue the fight against the colonists. al-Kattani wrote the terms under which the people of Fes would support him.

In the Hafidiya, Muhammad al-Katani refused to fight Abdelaziz and his followers to avoid Muslim on Muslim violence. He also condemned Sultan Abdelhafid's detention and torture of supporters of the former sultan Abdelaziz in Meknes and the sequestration of their funds, and refused to act as an intermediary between the two sides.

al-Katani repeatedly requested that Sultan Abdelhafid abide by the terms of the bay'ah, writing to him about this over and over, warning him of the risks of Morocco's descending into gorge of colonialism. He also released a fatwa ordaining a campaign of jihad against the colonialists, calling for an armed blockade of the French army at Tariq Za'ir outside of Rabat.

In order to foster the reconciliation of feuding tribes and present a united Moroccan front against French colonialism, al-Kattani organized a conference of tribes of the Middle Atlas held in Meknes on March 15, 1908. His father participated in this movement of jihad too, and joined him at the conference, in which they agreed to wage jihad against the French and Spanish colonizers.

=== Death ===
al-Kattani fled Fes with his family and his followers in 1909. He was captured by the forces of Sultan Abdelhafid, shaved, handcuffed, and paraded through the streets. His hands were cut off and his wounds were salted. He was beaten in front of his wives and children, and his body was thrown into an unmarked grave.

== Works ==
He left a corpus of over 300 pieces, of which about 27 were printed as books. He also left a diwan, or poetry collection, characterized as Sufi, philosophical, and romantic. It was gathered by Dr. Ismail al-Masawi in 2001.

Other works:

- مدارج الإسعاد الروحاني, on education
- الغيث المدرار في مولد مركز الأنوار, on Sufism

== See also ==
- Hafidiya
- es-Saada
- Nahda
