= Conditioned Bay'ah =

The Conditioned Bay'ah (Arabic: البيعة المشروطة, romanized: al-Bayeat al-Mashruta, lit. 'conditioned oath of allegiance'; January 5, 1908) or the Bay'ah of Fes was a bay'ah contract of the conditional support of the people of Fes, especially its ʿulamāʾ or religious scholars, for Abd al-Hafid as sultan of Morocco in the Hafidiya. Led by the Sufi leader Muhammad al-Kattani, the people of Fes imposed, for the first time in Morocco, a set of conditions on the sovereign in return for their support.

== History ==
The period of the Treaty of Algeciras in 1906, marked by state bankruptcy, failed taxes and rebellions, was turbulent for Sultan Abdelaziz. French forces led by Hubert Lyautey took Oujda in the east, in April 1907, ostensibly in retribution for the assassination of Émile Mauchamp in Marrakesh. In August, French warships bombarded Casablanca after an insurrection in response to the application of the terms of the Treaty of Algeciras. Abdelaziz was seen as lax and ineffective.

His brother, Abd al-Hafid, was seen as more forceful, and his bay'ah as sultan of Morocco was offered by the southern aristocrats in Marrakesh in September 1907. Abd al-Hafid's support came from the Amazigh of the south, instead of the ulama of Fes, who felt bypassed and considered the bay'ah in Marrakesh illegitimate.

Muhammad al-Kattani pushed his community in Fes to rebuke Abdelaziz and to support Abd al-Hafid under conditions, which were reportedly referred to as the "Kattani Conditions" (Arabic: الشروط الكتانية, romanized: ash-Shurūt al-Kattāniya).

== Conditions ==
The Conditioned Bay'ah had stipulations that included that Abd al-Hafid had to consult the Ummah in all major decisions and wage jihad for the liberation of Morocco, which had been occupied by France in Oujda since April and in Casablanca since August.

It essentially called for Abd al-Hafid to back out of the 1906 Treaty of Algeciras and also called for an end to the protégé system.

== Impact ==
The support of Fes changed the course of Abdelhafid's struggle for power, as other Moroccan imperial cities followed suit. However, Abdelaziz, encouraged by the French, continued to resist until his defeat in the Battle of Marrakesh on August 19, 1908.
