= Dar Ba Mohammed Chergui =

Historic palace in Morocco

Coordinates: 34°03′48.2″N 4°58′48.4″W

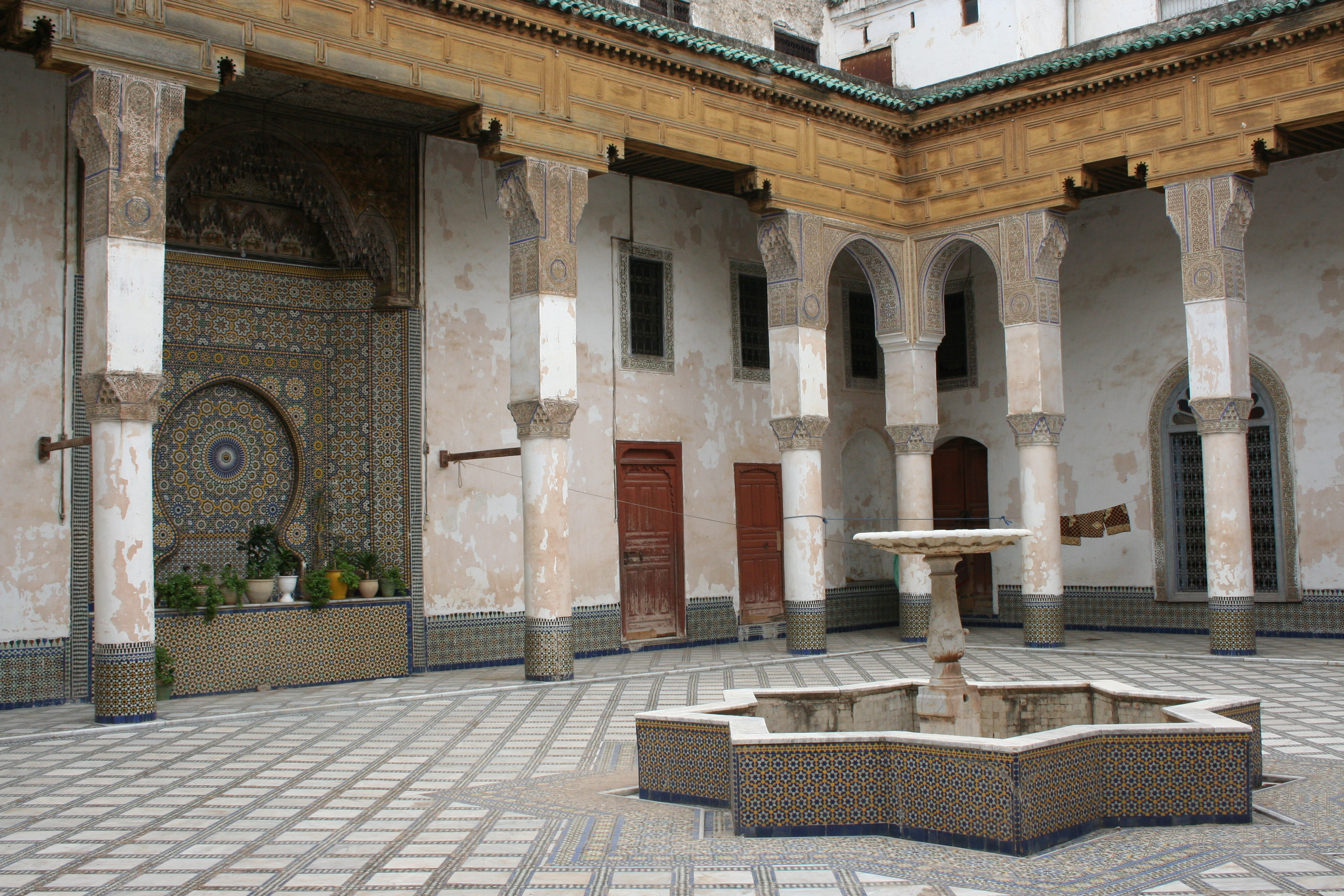
The courtyard of the main house (photo from 2006)

Dar Ba Mohammed Chergui, also known as Dar al-Aman, is a historic palace or riad-style mansion in the old medina of Fez, Morocco. It is located on Derb el Horra street in Fes el-Bali.

== History and state of preservation ==
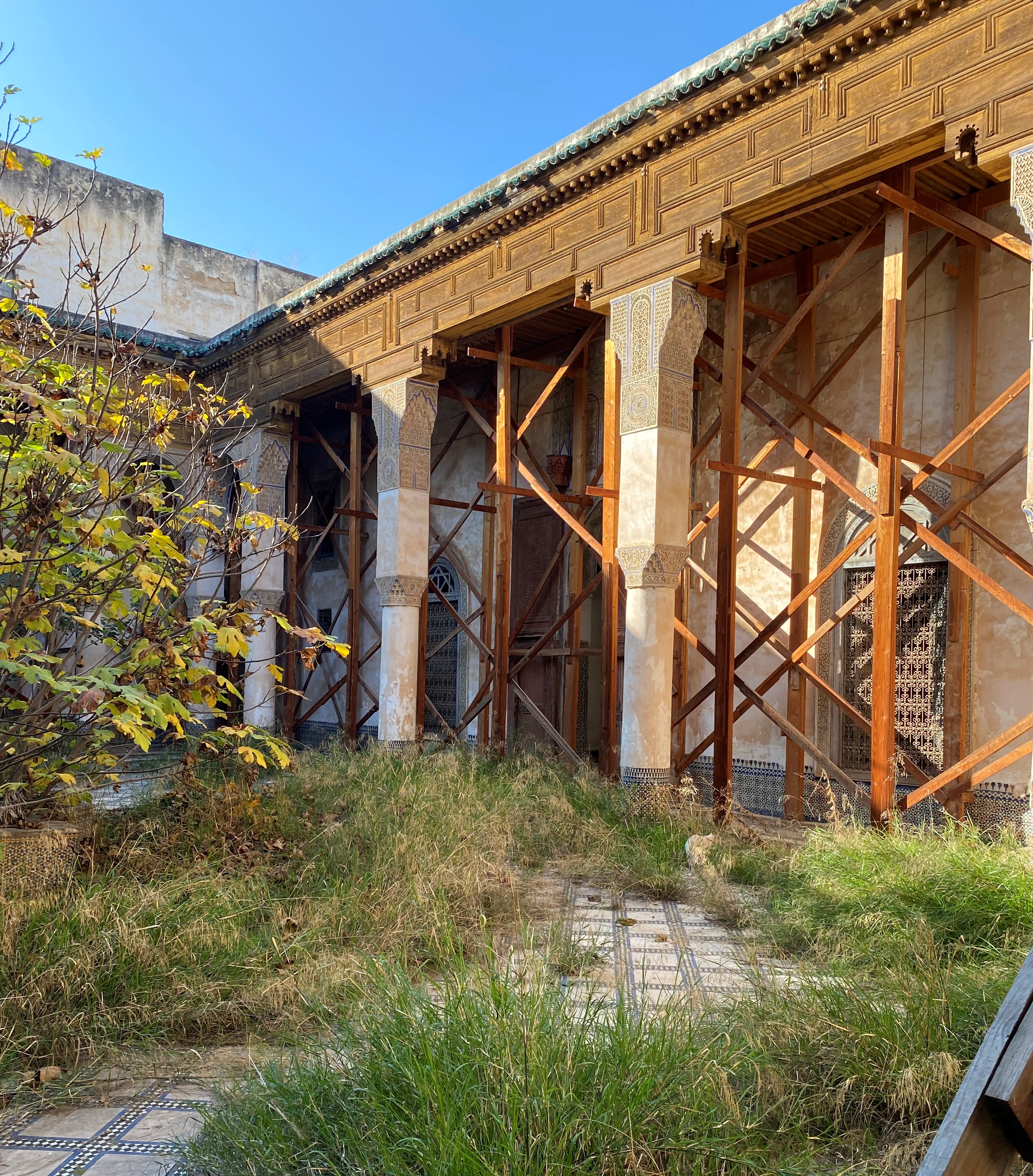
The same courtyard in dilapidated condition, late 2022

The house was constructed over 15 years in the early 20th century and is named after the former qa'id (judge) Ba Mohammed Chergui who lived here. In her book on Islamic gardens, D. Fairchild Ruggles also identifies the palace as that of Pasha 'Abd al-Kari and states that it was built instead in 1860.

In 2008 the palace was purchased by international private investors following a long negotiation process with around 60 inheritors of the house. The intention of the purchase was to convert the palace into a five-star hotel. Some observers report that the palace is currently in a dilapidated state and not accessible to visitors.

== Description ==
The palace is among the most impressive historic houses in the city, along with examples like Dar Moqri, Dar Glaoui, and Dar Adiyel. It consists of two main houses next to each other, together covering some 1800 square meters. The main house (dar kbira) consists of a central courtyard paved and decorated with marble and zellij tiling, around which were three ornate halls with cupola ceilings as well as a large and ornate wall fountain. The second house, covering about 650 square meters, includes a large courtyard garden with a unique arrangement of star-shaped and cross-shaped planters and three fountains, all covered with zellij, and a surrounding portico or gallery.

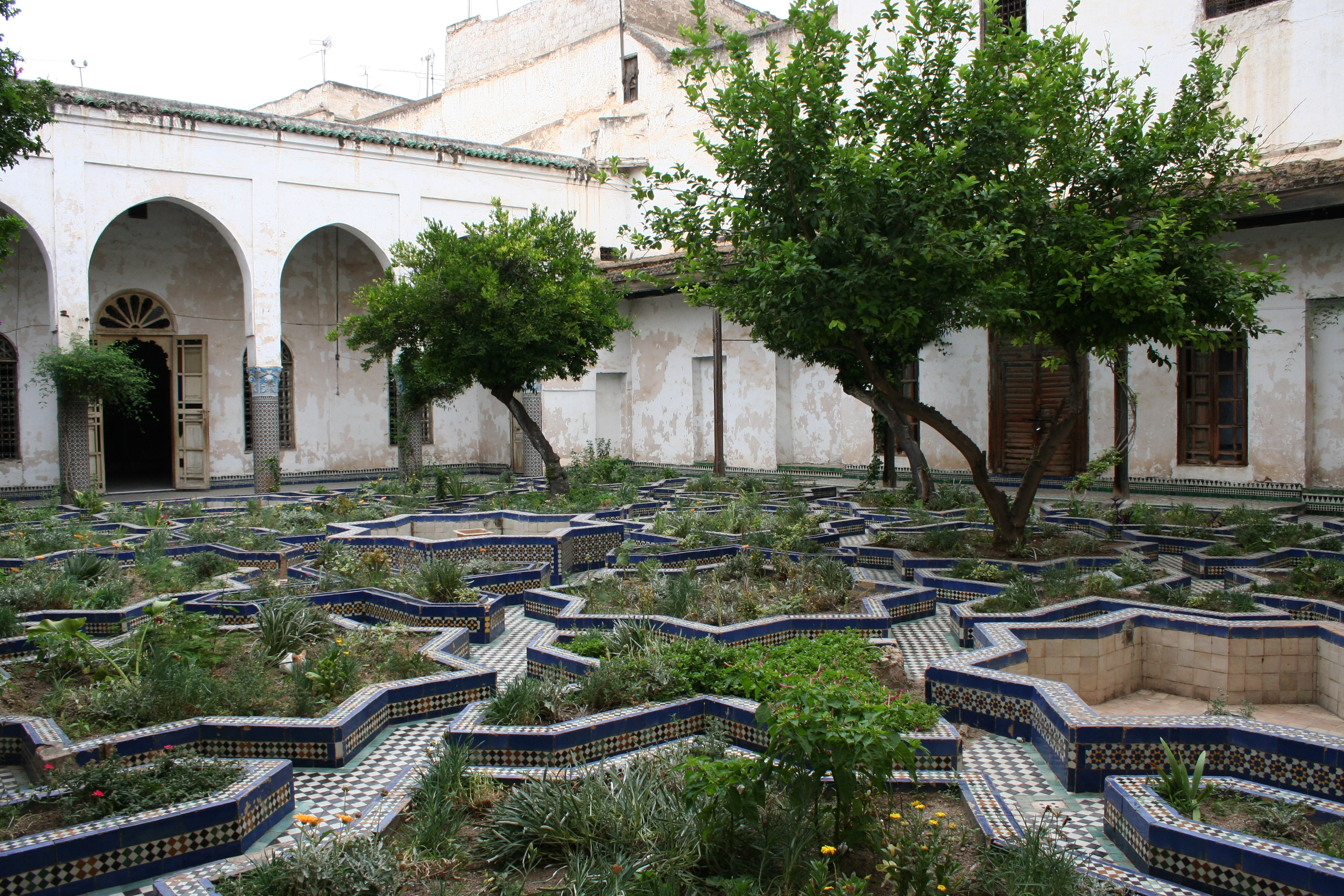
The courtyard garden, as it appeared in 2006

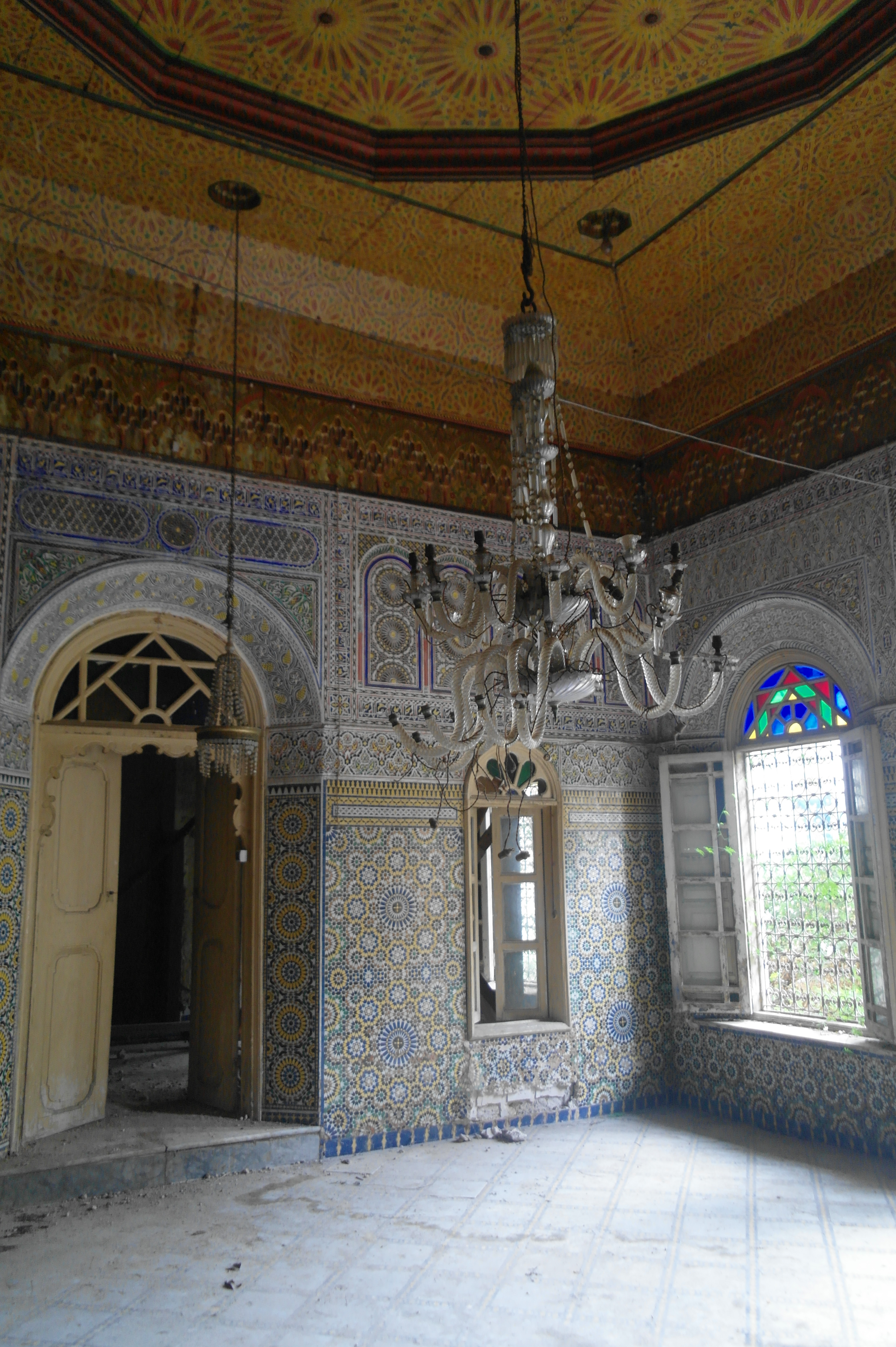
One of the richly decorated halls (2018)

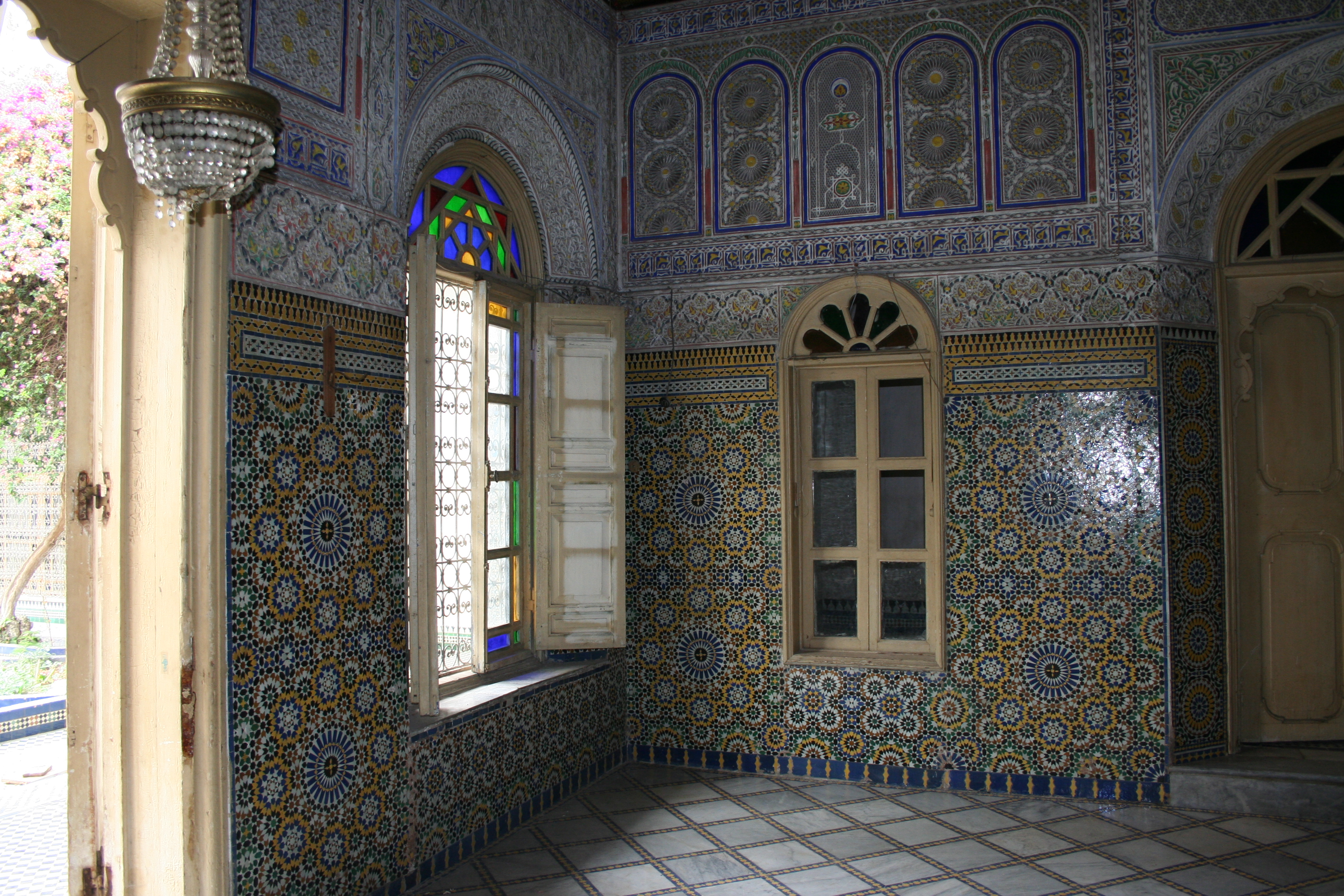
Details of the interior decoration (2006)

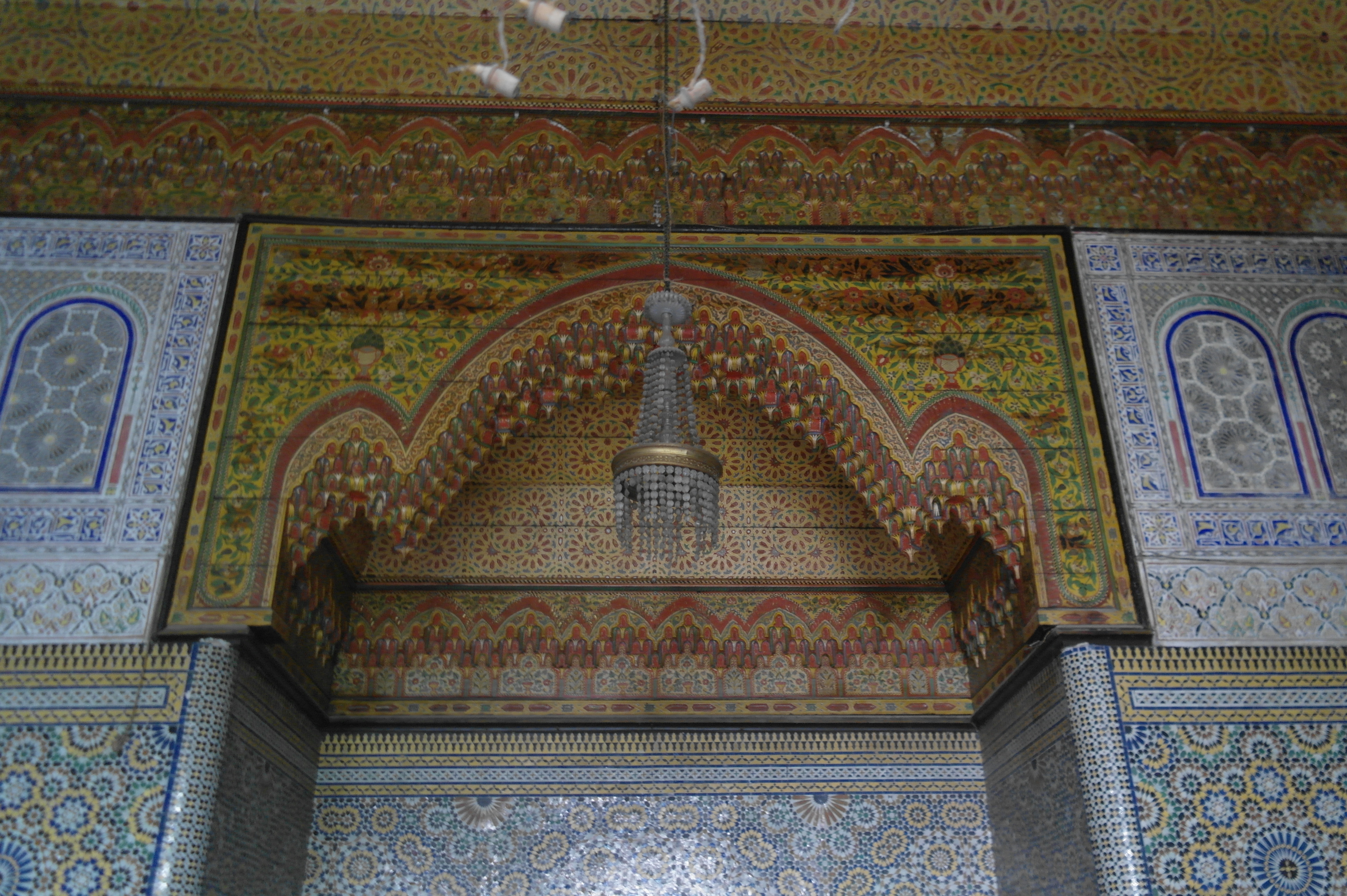
A decorative alcove inside one of the halls (2018)
