= Al-Moqri =

al-Muqri may refer to:

- Ahmed Mohammed al-Maqqari, 16th-century historian
- Muhammad al-Muqri, 19th–20th century statesman
