= Dar Moqri =

Palace in Fes, Morocco

Coordinates: 34°03′30.6″N 4°58′30.5″W

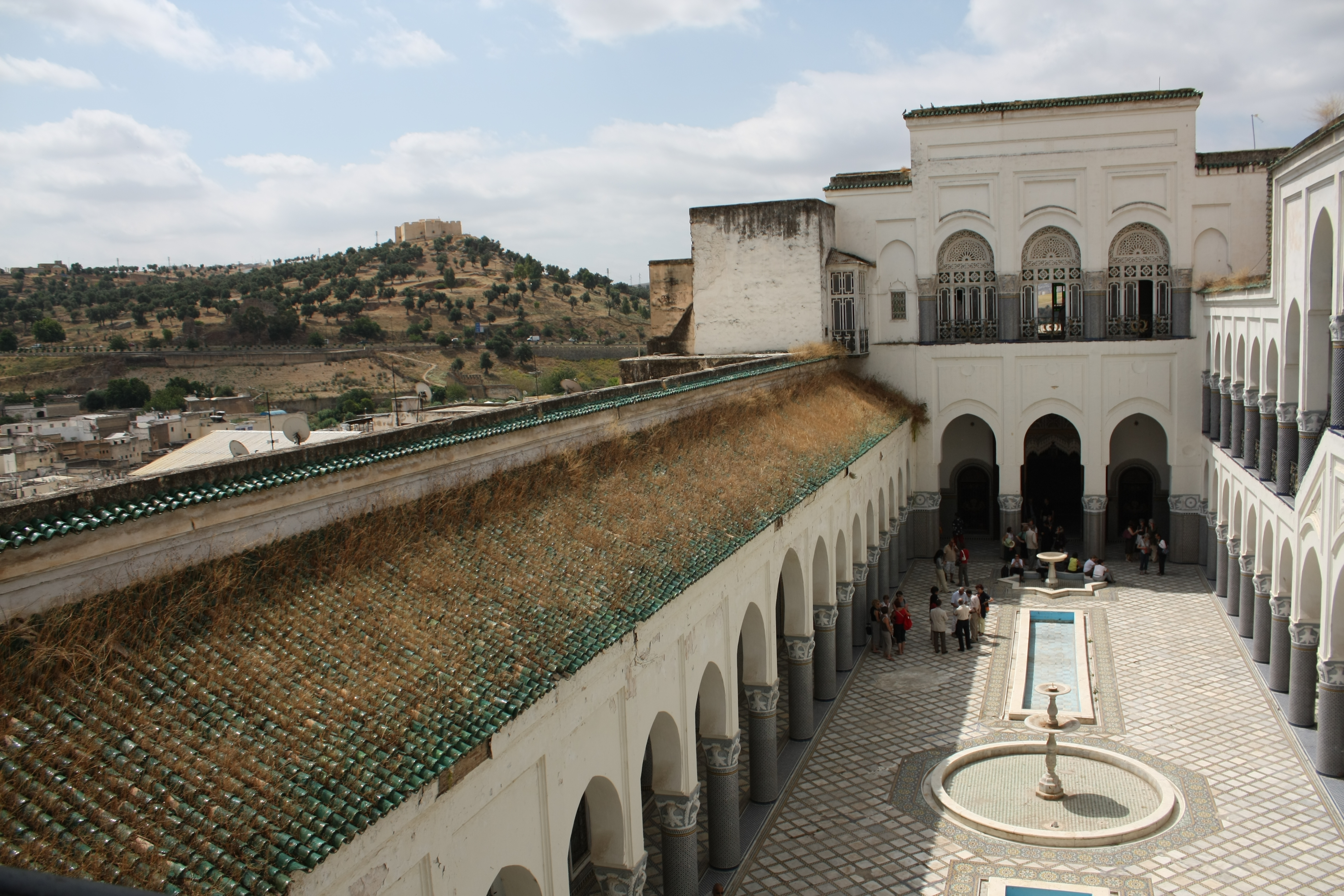
Dar Moqri, view over the courtyard of the southern house built by Si Tayb

Dar Moqri (Arabic: دار المقري; also spelled Dar al-Moqri or Dar Mokri) is a historic palace or group of mansions in Fes el-Bali, the old medina of Fes, Morocco. It dates from the late 19th and early 20th centuries and was built by the wealthy and powerful Moqri family. The site is occupied by two grand residences built separately by members of the same family but physically adjoining each other. The older palace was begun by Abdelsalam al-Moqri and probably further modified by his son Muhammad. In addition to its rich interior, it is notable for its large terraced garden. The second palace belonged to his grandson Si Tayb and is notable for its long courtyard which mixes Italianate details with traditional Moroccan decoration. A completely separate palace, known as Riad Driss Moqri, was also built further north by Abdelsalam's son, Si Dris.

== Historical background ==
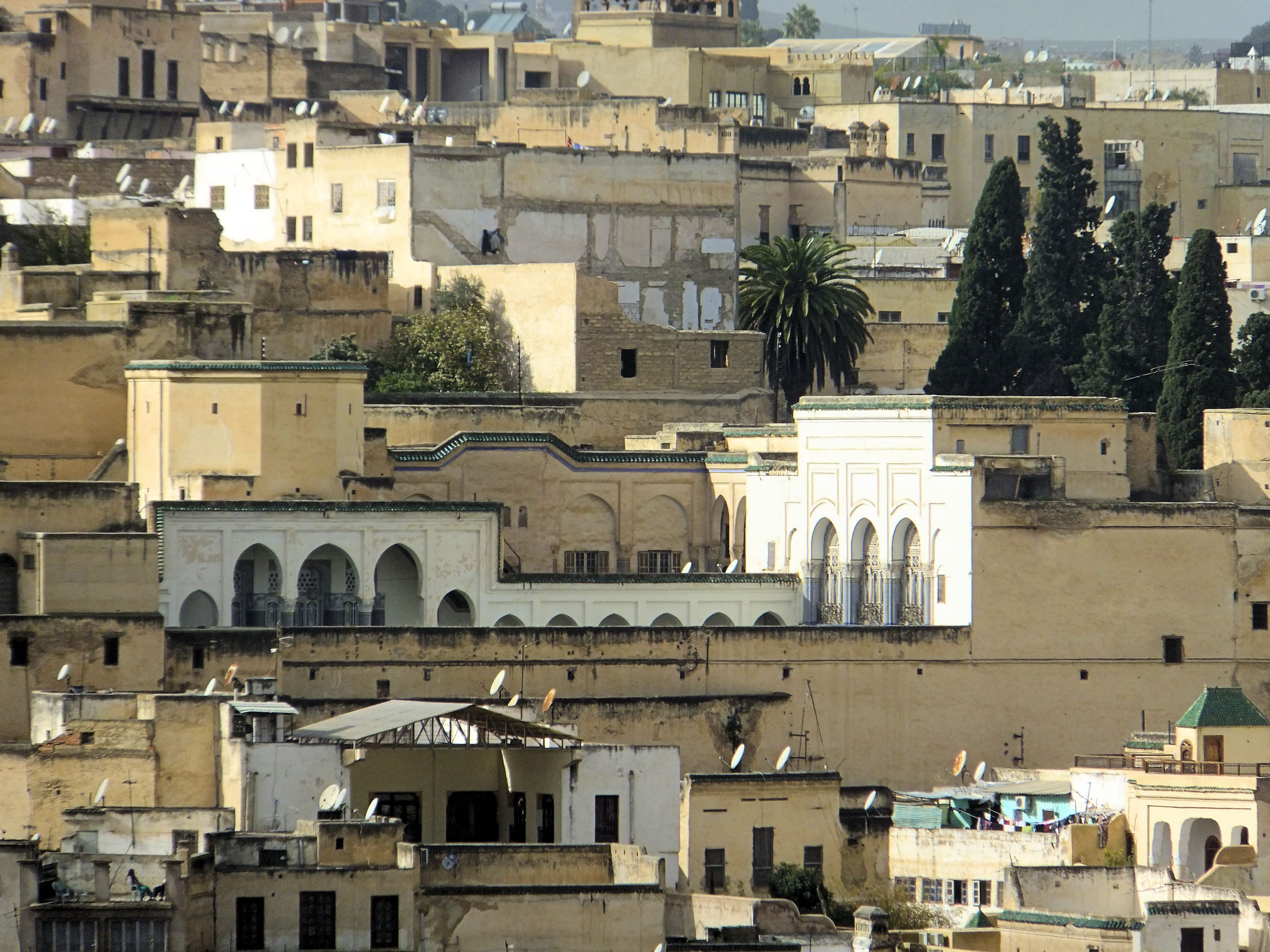
Dar Moqqri, seen from the south on the medina skyline

The Moqri family was a wealthy family of merchant origin which rose to prominence within the royal government (or makhzen). They originated from Tlemcen, Algeria, and immigrated to Morocco at the beginning of the 19th century under their patriarch Abu Abdallah Muhammad al-Akhal, settling in Fez in 1805. He had three sons who each led a major branch of the family afterwards. One of them, Haj Abdesalam al-Moqri, rose to prominent positions under Sultan Moulay Hassan. He first worked as an amin (magistrate or secretary) working at the Funduq el-Jild under the direction of the secretary of the treasury at the time, Haj Bel-Madani Bennis. It was around this time that he started building his palace, Dar Moqri. Historical documents of the house's floor plan indicate that it existed or was being built in 1880. He later became the secretary of finance (amin al-mustafad) in Dar Adiyil (the state treasury at the time) and then the secretary of royal constructions (amin bina' malaki). As secretary of royal constructions, he was charged by Moulay Hassan to oversee the construction of the Dar al-Makina and of the Dar Batha and Dar al-Baida Palaces. He was also charged in 1889 with resolving issues with the water supply of the Oued Fes. These responsibilities gave him considerable prestige and importance which afforded him the ability to build a great mansion for himself. The size and richness of the residence reflects his family's wealth at the time. An inscription in the house records the date 1901-02, which probably indicates a major renovation at this time.

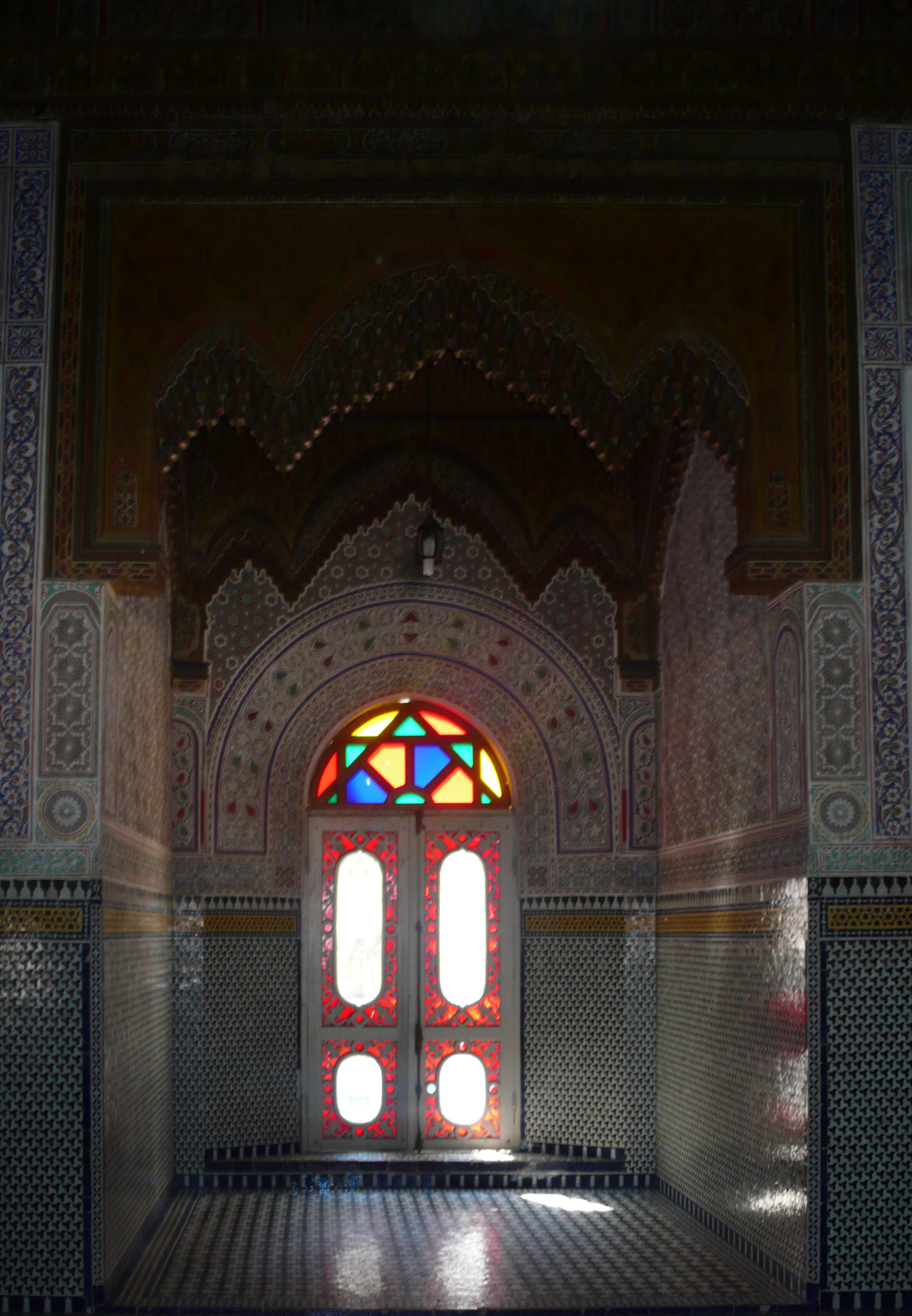
Ornate room in the Riad Driss Moqri, the mansion of Muhammad al-Moqri's brother, located further north from Dar Moqri

Abdelsalam died at the age of 75 in 1905, leaving three sons: Hajj Muhammad, Si Dris, and Si Ahmad. Muhammad al-Mokri assisted and then replaced his father as secretary of royal constructions before becoming secretary in charge of the markets and trades (amin al-shukara). In 1905 he rose to the position of grand vizier under Sultan Abdelaziz. Around this time, the Glaoui and Moqri families became the two most important families in Morocco (aside from the royal family), dividing most of the important government positions between them. During this period, only the highest-ranking head of the Moqri family resided in the main palace of Dar Moqri. Muhammad al-Moqri eventually became one of the most important figures in modern Moroccan history. He was grand vizier under Sultan Abd al-Hafid when the French Protectorate was imposed on Morocco in 1912 and he kept this post under Abd al-Hafid's formal successors throughout the 44-year period of French colonial rule, until right after Moroccan independence in 1956. He died in 1957, at the age of 105. During his tenure, one of his sons, known as Si Tayb, served as delegate of the minister of finances. It was he who built a second mansion adjoining the main family palace to the southeast, with a long courtyard and Italianate details. His brother, Si Dris, served as muhtasib of Fez. He owned a library and built his own luxurious mansion, also known as the "Riad Driss Moqri", located separately in the Oued Sawwafin neighbourhood (also spelled Oued Swafin or Oued Souafine) further north.

The exact chronology of the construction of the main Dar Moqri palace is difficult to establish, but it may have been completed in its present form in the early 20th century by Muhammad al-Moqri.

== Location ==
Dar Moqri is located in the district which was historically known as al-'Uyun ("the Sources") and is known today as the Ziat or Ziyat neighbourhood. Until the 19th century this area had been a garden district with few houses and plenty of open space to build, thus attracting the construction of several new mansions by wealthy families. Abdelsalam al-Mokri's patron, Bel-Madani Bennis, had already built a palace (no longer preserved) in this neighbourhood when Abdelsalam started construction on his own mansion. The Glaoui family and the al-Tazi family also built their palatial mansions (Dar Glaoui and Dar Tazi) in the same district nearby. These two mansions still exist today.

== Architecture ==
The palace is considered one of the finest examples of late 19th and early 20th century domestic architecture in Fes. It covers two-and-a-half acres or one hectare. Its layout and form are somewhat atypical of other Moroccan mansions of the era, especially compared to the more classical architecture of its nearby contemporaries like the Dar Glaoui and Dar al-Tazi. It is organized around two sections – the main house and the garden area – with two different axes, instead of one main axis with symmetrical structures on either side.

The large garden to the north is divided into three terraces with views over the city. The lowest terrace of this garden is larger than the others and is divided into four parts by two intersecting paths and a central fountain, much like a traditional riad garden. The gardens are planted tall cypress trees alongside various other trees and plants. Several small structures and kiosks are built around the edges of the gardens. One of them was originally a music pavilion while another used to be a hammam (bathhouse), but both have been repurposed today.

The main residential complex to the south consists of two main courtyards or patios each surrounded by an array of rooms across two stories. There are at least fifty rooms in all, including guest rooms, along with private hammams, kitchens, stables, and storage areas. Of the two main courtyards, the one to the north is smaller and rectangular while the one to the south is larger and has an irregular quadrilateral shape. The northern courtyard and its adjacent sections are probably older than the southern section and would thus correspond with the house originally built by Abdelsalam al-Moqri in the late 19th century. The southern courtyard was more likely built later in the first half of the 20th century.

The northern courtyard has a central fountain with a water basin shaped like an eight-pointed star. Unlike other traditional Moroccan house courtyards, there are no galleries on any side. An imposing wooden canopy, richly sculpted with geometric patterns and muqarnas friezes, projects inward from the upper part of all four walls to form a large skylight. In the northwest wall of the courtyard is a large alcove (similar to an iwan) containing a large wall fountain covered with rich zellij (mosaic tilework) in radiating star patterns. The fountain is sheltered under a muqarnas ceiling. Large double doors occupy the center of the other three sides of the courtyard and grant access to large decorated chambers. Other smaller doorways in the corners of the courtyard grant access to the different wings of the house. The northeast wing is occupied by a large chamber opening from the two-story masriya or reception room for guests, while on a floor above this is a hall covered by a grand wooden dome which was probably added at a later period after the construction of the original palace. Today the masriya is independent from the rest of the palace and is entered through a different street. The northwest wing is occupied by an entrance passage, stairway, and a large kitchen on the ground floor, while on the upper floor is a great hall covered by a small but ornate wooden dome, with more chambers around it. This upper floor area may have served as a guesthouse (dar ḍiyaf). The southwest wing is situated on the upper floor and constitutes the former hammam of the palace, today repurposed as a separate apartment. The southeast wing consists of several rooms on both the ground floor and upper floor. The upper floor includes a rectangular hall that is richly decorated and covered by a grand wooden ceiling of the berchla (or bershla) type. This wing grants access to the large southern courtyard. This courtyard is in turn is flanked by its more rooms and structures, but their architecture is less notable than the northern parts of the palace.

The mansion of Si Tayb al-Moqri is separate from the older Moqri palace but directly adjoins it to the southeast. It is centered around a long rectangular patio surrounded by a two-story gallery on three sides and single-story arcade on one side. It is decorated with marble and faience tiles, star-shaped water basins, white marble fountains, zellij tilework, carved stucco, and sculpted wood ceilings. The house was reportedly designed by an Italian architect and as a result there are also traces of European influence, including classic Italian motifs appearing in the carved capitals of the columns around the courtyard.
