= Lalla Batoul =

Moroccan political prisoner

Lalla Batoul Benaîssa (Arabic: لالة بتول بن عيسى) is believed to be the first woman in modern Morocco to have been imprisoned for political reasons. In 1910, she was jailed and tortured by Sultan Abdelhafid as the wife of El-Bacha Benaïssa, the Governor of Fez and one of the principal aides of his brother Abdelaziz, whom he had overthrown in 1908.

In 1910, writing for The Times, Walter Harris revealed that Batoul had been imprisoned in a palace cell in Fez. Harris describes the events as follows:

[The sultan] gave orders that the fortune [of the governor of Fez] was to be found; and thus fresh privations and more floggings ensued, but all to no avail. Then the women were arrested, amongst them the aristocratic wife of the Governor of Fez, a lady of good family and high position. It was thought that she would know, and disclose the hidden treasure. She was tortured, but disclosed nothing.

The torturing consisted of her being chained to irons and hung naked on a wall in the crucifixion position. Under the personal supervision of Abdelhafid, she underwent flogging sessions while her breasts were seized in a vice.

The reason for her capture and torture was Abdelhafid's intent to arrest all aides who had served his brother Abdelaziz. They included Batoul's husband, El-Bacha Benaïssa, one of his closest aides, together with over 20 members of his family. In 2013, the Moroccan historian Maati Monjib discovered documents in the colonial archives in Nantes that revealed that Lalla Batoul not only was an intelligent and cultured aristocrat but also had a well-developed set of connections with Europeans living in Morocco. Her torture in the presence of the sultan demonstrates how the monarchy was ready to repress women who exceeded their assigned roles.
