= Abd al-Hafid of Morocco =

Sultan of Morocco from 1909 to 1912

Abd al-Hafid of Morocco عبد الحفيظ بن الحسن العلوي
- Imam
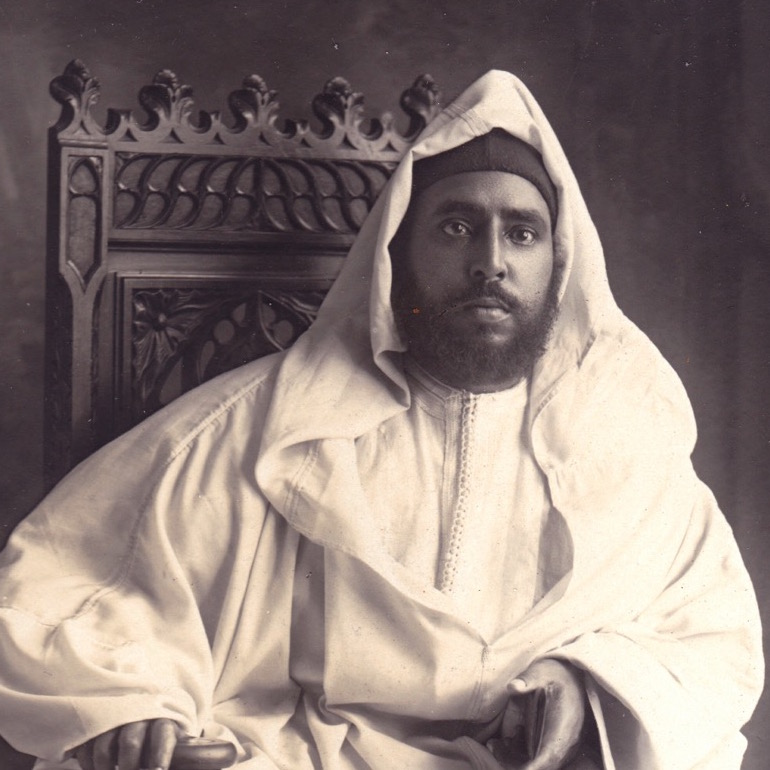
- Portrait taken by J. Giry and given as a gift to Ridder van Rappard, special envoy of the Netherlands, on 13 February 1913

Sultan of Morocco
- Reign: 21 August 1908 – 13 August 1912
- Predecessor: Abdelaziz
- Successor: Yusef
- Born: 1875-1880; Fez, Sultanate of Morocco
- Died: 4 April 1937 (aged 62); Saint Georges Castle, Enghien-les-Bains, France
- Burial: Moulay Abdallah Mosque, Fez, Morocco
- Wives: Lalla Rabia; Rabha; Lalla Ruqiya
- Issue: Moulay Idris; Lalla Mina; Moulay Slimane Hafidi
Regnal name
- al-Ghāzī lit. 'victor in the holy war'
- Dynasty: Alawi dynasty
- Father: Hassan I
- Mother: Aliya al-Settatiya
- Religion: Sunni Islam (Salafiyya) (before 1912); Sunni Islam (Tijaniyya) (after 1912)

Abd al-Hafid ibn al-Hasan (Note: Arabic: عبد الحفيظ بن الحسن العلوي, romanized: ʿAbd al-Ḥafīẓ ibn al-Ḥasan al-ʿAlawī; also known as Moulay Abdelhafid (Arabic: مولاي الحفيظ, romanized: Mawlāy ʿAbd al-Ḥafīẓ) and Moulay Hafid (Arabic: مولاي حفيظ, romanized: Mawlāy Ḥafīẓ). He went by the regnal title of al-Ghāzī (lit. 'victor in the holy war').) (between 1875 and 1880 – 4 April 1937) was the Sultan of Morocco from 1908 to 1912 and a member of the Alaouite Dynasty. His younger brother, Abdelaziz of Morocco, preceded him. While Abd al-Hafid initially opposed his brother, finally deposing him in a coup, for giving some concessions to foreign powers, he himself became increasingly backed by the French and finally signed the protectorate treaty giving de facto control of the country to France.

== Early life ==
Abd al-Hafid ibn al-Hasan was born in Fez (Fes) between 1875 and 1880 to Moulay Hassan I of Morocco and Aliya al-Settatiya, who was the daughter of the governor Salah ibn al-Ghazi and granddaughter of al-Ghazi ibn al-Madani, governor of Rabat, Chaouia and Tadla under Slimane of Morocco. She was from the rural gentry of the Arab confederation of Chaouia. He was the fourth son of Hassan.

Before the Hafidiya, in 1897, he was appointed khalifa (royal governor) of Tiznit until 1901, where he was appointed khalifa of Marrakesh. Not much is known about the period of his life as khalifa of Tiznit.

While he was khalifa of Marrakesh, he became influenced by Ma al-Aynayn. He studied religious science under him receiving an ijaza (diploma) from him in 1904.

== Hafidiya ==
After his brother Abdelaziz appointed him as khalifa of Marrakesh, Abd al-Hafid sought to have him overthrown by fomenting distrust over Abdelaziz's European ties. Abd al-Hafid was aided by Madani al-Glaoui, older brother of T'hami, one of the Qaids of the Atlas. He was assisted in the training of his troops by Andrew Belton, a British officer and veteran of the Second Boer War. At this point, Abdelaziz was becoming less popular with the tribes weakening his rule over Morocco. When he attempted to send Ibn al-Ghazi to become pasha of Marrakesh after the murder of Émile Mauchamp, the tribes of the Haouz revolted with the Rahamna demanding Abd al-Hafid to become sultan. After the invasion of Chaouia, the tribes of Chaouia gathered and were led by Abu Azzawi who sent a letter to Abd al-Hafid calling him to "take action to restore Islam from the low estate into which it had fallen".

In February 1908, Abd al-Hafid was proclaimed the Sultan of Fez. For a brief period, Abdelaziz reigned from Rabat while Abd al-Hafid reigned in Marrakesh and Fez. In August 1908 Abdelaziz was defeated in battle. In 1909, Abd al-Hafid became the recognized leader of Morocco.

Writing contemporaneously about his rule in 1909, George Frederick Andrews says that Abd al-Hafid "must play a very shrewd game. To maintain his authority over the tribes he must continue to appear decidedly anti-European in his feelings and his policy. On the other hand he must have money and the money must come from Europe. Also he knows that Morocco must submit to such reforms as have been decreed by the conference of the powers."

== Reign ==
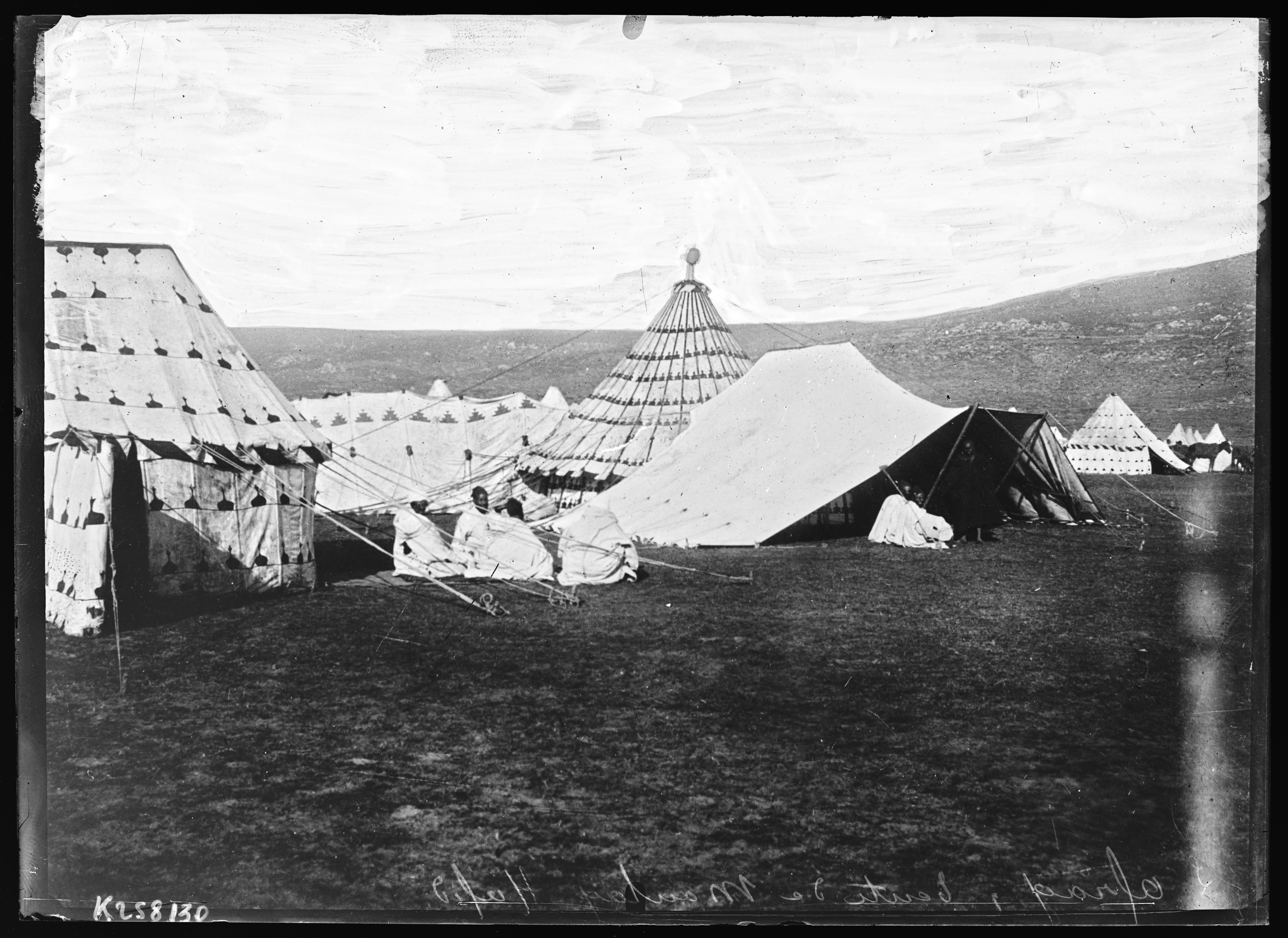
The Afrag, tent of Abd al-Hafid

=== Political base ===
Abd al-Hafid preferred to rely on personal loyalties and ties of kin than the unstable and diverse coalition of supporters he built. His new makhzen was built up by big qaids. Madani al-Glaoui became Minister of War, Isa ibn Umar al-Abdi, who was pasha of Safi and head of the Abda tribal confederation, became Minister of Foreign Affairs and Abd al-Malik al-Mtouggi became wazir al-shikayat.

=== Foreign relations ===
After Abd al-Hafid took over, European countries still saw Abdelaziz as the legitimate sultan and the income from customs went to him. As long as he did not accept the controversial Act of Algericas, they refused to recognise his government depriving him from the customs revenue. During the Hafidiya, relations between Abd al-Hafid and the French deteriorated with the French seeing him as a bloodthirsty tyrant while seeing Abdelaziz as more legitimate. They assisted Abdelaziz with military advice and armament because they thought that Abdelaziz's weakness would make a French takeover easier while Abd al-Hafid could lead an effective jihad against European influence. Abd al-Hafid was faced with the dilemma of accommodating foreign pressure without alienating and losing his political base which he relied on for his survival. In order to appease the Europeans, Abd al-Hafid would have had to make compromises amounting to both a rejection of the Conditioned Bay'ah imposed on him and the principles of the Hafidiya.

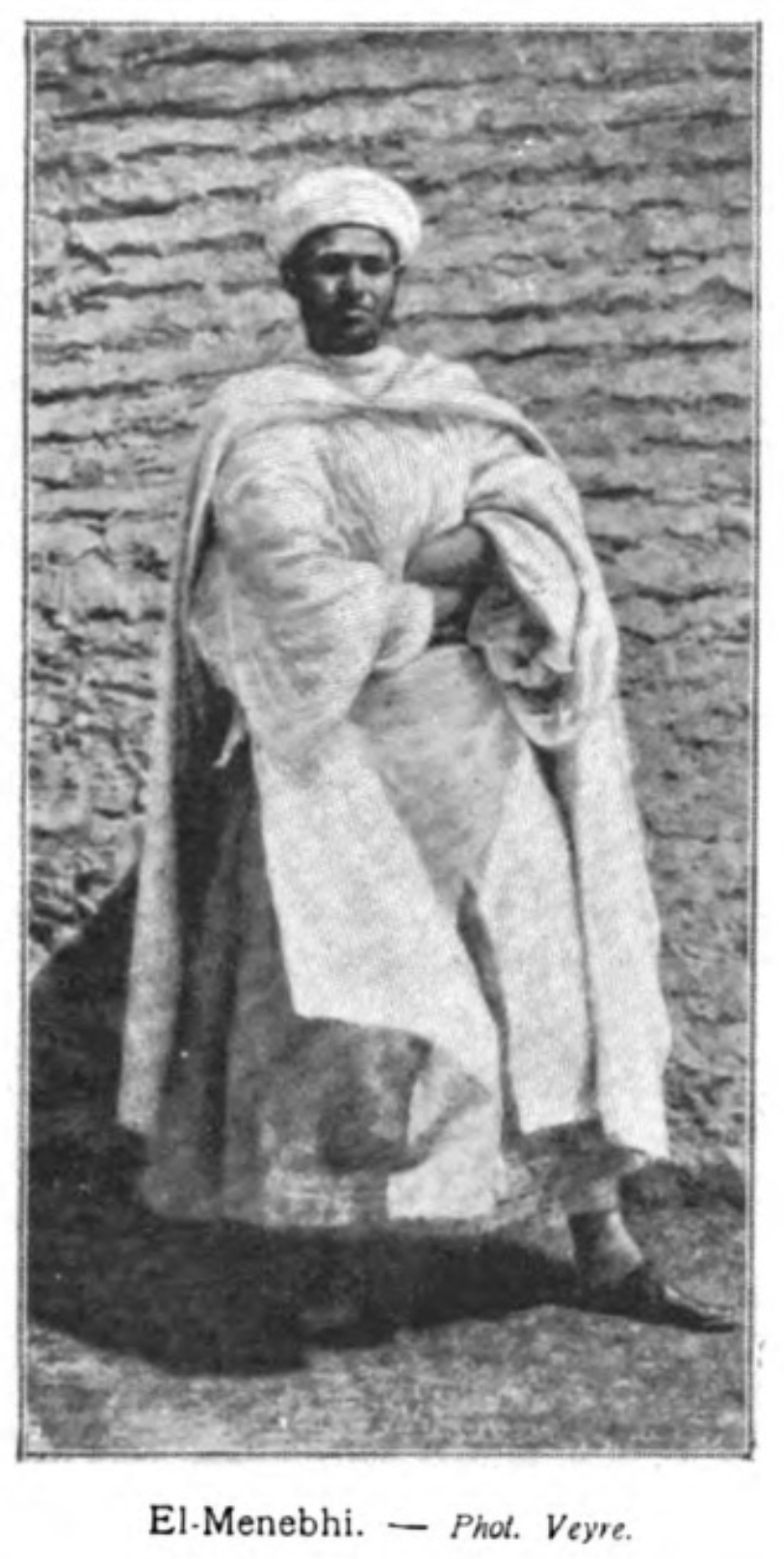
Mahdi al-Munabbhi, previously disgraced under Abdelaziz, had a resurgence in 1908 with Abd al-Hafid naming him Friend and Counselor of the Makhzen (Note: "The ubiquitous al-Munabbhī enjoyed something of a resurgence during the autumn of 1908. He was named Friend and Counselor of the Makhzan by ʿAbd al-Ḥafīẓ and himself drafted, or suggested changes in, several letters to the powers during this period. He served as intermediary between the French and the sultan in the negotiations which preceded recognition of the regime. As the brother-in-law of Madanī al-Glawī he also acted as mediator in the discussions between the sultan and his chief vassal in the south. In addition, he acted as a clandestine agent in the exchange of letters between ʿAbd al-Ḥafīẓ and the German minister at Tangier, Dr. Rosen.")

Abd al-Hafid sought diplomatic relations with European countries so he could receive the customs receipts that were piling up in the State Bank of Morocco. In September 1908, a German consul arrived in the capital of Morocco which led to a French response. The French sent Si Kaddour Benghabrit to Fez to put the French consular post office back in operation and he entered into contact with Abd al-Hafid discreetly leading to serious negotiations happening. The French government demanded that Abd al-Hafid accept the Act of Algericas and all other treaties and honour all Moroccan debts. Abd al-Hafid, with the assistance of Mahdi al-Munabbhi, sent a letter to the powers promising to accept the Act of Algericas, honour the debts of his predecessors and pay for the indemnities and the cost of the French campaign in Oujda and Chaouia. One of the initial demands of the French was for Abd al-Hafid to renounce the jihad in a letter to be read in every mosque of Morocco but the British and the German governments managed to tone this demand down knowing the danger it would have posed to the stability of Abd al-Hafid's rule.

On September 14, the French and Spanish governments announced their provisional recognition of Abd al-Hafid's government and this was circulated among the powers for government and approval. On the 5 January 1909, the new government was officially recognised allowing for normalisation of relations between Morocco and the powers and granting Abd al-Hafid access to the 12 million francs in the state bank. The French military mission to Fez also returned the same month. The negotiations that came after this centred on Morocco's attempts to have the clauses of the Act of Algericas modified or have the act abolished altogether. This French mission was joined by a Spanish one but negotiations with Spain went poorly as Abd al-Hafid refused any concession of Spain over Ceuta and Melilla until combined pressure from Spain and France forced Abd al-Hafid to relent. Because of the need for finances and Abd al-Hafid's weak domestic position, a Moroccan diplomat mission was sent to Paris consisting of the minister of finances, Muhammad al-Muqri, the minister of foreign affairs, Abdallah al-Fasi, and two other makhzen officials. France made further demands like calling for the makhzen to sever all connections with Ma al-'Aynayn.

After the defeat of Bou Hmara, Abd al-Hafid's rule in central Morocco became much more stable allowing for his approach to France to become bolder. He became increasingly more anti-French which appeased militants in Fez. He sought relations with powers like Germany, Italy and the Ottoman Empire. In the summer, Abd al-Hafid invited the Italian government to resume its military mission in Fez. He hoped these relations with Italy would prevent France from taking direct action in Morocco. However, instead of getting diplomatic support from Italy, Abd al-Hafid was rebuffed by them. Abd al-Hafid was most successful with the Ottoman Empire which was run by the Young Turks who adopted a policy of supporting other Muslims outside the Ottoman Empire who resisted the West. Abd al-Hafid similarly had pan-Islamist beliefs. One of the demands of the supporters of the Hafidiya was for closer relations with the rest of the Muslim world. In 1909, the Young Turk government sent a 12-man military mission to Morocco. This mission was attached to the makhzen army as advisors and accompanied the troops in manoeuvrers against dissident tribes north of Fez. It was commanded by Captain Arif Bey and was made up of Turkish, Syrian and Egyptian officers. While the mission was there, they founded the pan-Islamist youth organisation "Young Maghreb" which also had members in other North African countries like Egypt and Algeria. Other pan-Islamist organisations emerged during this time with one, al-Itiihad al-Maghrebi (Union of the Maghreb), planning riots against the French. The Turkish military mission was forced to leave in March 1910 because of French diplomatic pressure.

Abd al-Hafid's attempts to break out diplomatic isolation and find allies were ultimately a failure. According to the historian Edmund Burke III, "the French position was unassailable".

=== Despotism ===
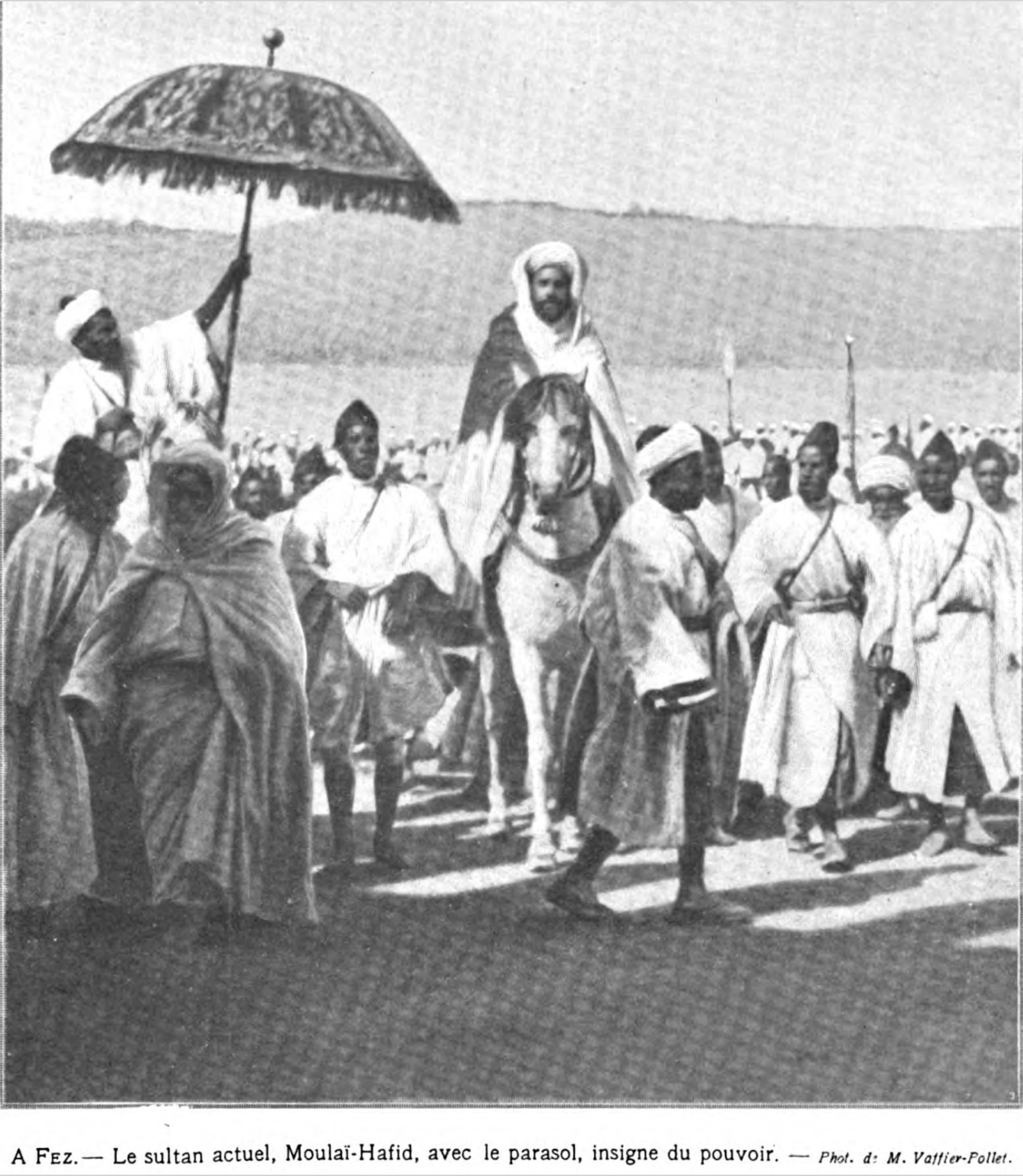
Before his exile, Abd al-Hafid destroyed the royal parasol and the imperial seal, emblems of the sultan's authority, as a symbolic act of defiance.

Mawlay Mahammad, the brother of Abd al-Hafid, attempted to become sultan with the support of the Zaër in 1908. He was quickly recaptured and paraded in rags in the city of Fez before disappearing. He did survive this, but his secretary died after being publicly tortured with his head shaved, beard plucked and hands disabled by salt torture. Muhammad al-Kattani, the influential Sufi poet and anti-French activist from Fez, was captured, tortured, and beaten to death in front of his wives and children in 1909. Abd al-Hafid's opposition to al-Kattani was not only because of their dispute over resisting the West but due to Abd al-Hafid's Salafist beliefs. The Ait Ndhir tribe who gave protection to al-Kattani were punished brutally by Abd al-Hafid. Initially, he demanded an indemnity of 100,000 douros. After they refused and were defeated in battle, they were given even harsher terms including the payment of the fine, acceptance of qaids appointed by the makhzen and a supply of 300 men to serve in the Sharifian army marking the first time a Middle Atlas tribe was forced to supply men to the Sharifian army. In 1909, when he captured Bou Hmara, Abd al-Hafid fed Bou Hmara to his lions. Punishments like mutilation were applied to his servants.

In May 1910, the pasha of Meknes and governor of Fez, Hajj Ibn Aissa ibn Hammu, and his family were arrested. He was accused of supporting Abdelaziz and inciting the Zemmour tribe to rebel. The wife of Ibn Aissa, Lalla Batoul, a Fesi aristocrat and supporter of Abdelaziz, was tortured. She was chained to the wall in a crucifixion position, completely naked with her breasts seized in a vice, and whipped and interrogated about the whereabouts of her husband's fortune under the direct supervision of Abd al-Hafid. She had a network of connections with Europeans living in Morocco allowing the news of her torture to spread widely in the international press. This allowed her to eventually be released even though her husband was not. For example, Walter Burton Harris reported on the incident in an article published in the Times of Morocco:

[The sultan] gave orders that the fortune [of the governor of Fez] was to be found; and thus fresh privations and more floggings ensued, but all to no avail. Then the women were arrested, amongst them the aristocratic wife of the Governor of Fez, a lady of good family and high position. It was thought that she would know, and disclose the hidden treasure. She was tortured, but disclosed nothing.

The Ibn Aissa affair alongside the punishment against Bou Hmara and his servants and al-Kattani alienated the tribes around Fez and the community of Fez. This repression was also ineffective as rural opposition still persisted and both the French and Spanish armies occupied more territory in Morocco.

These punishments appalled humanitarians in Europe but Abd al-Hafid dismissed them as he saw these punishments as not just a way of punishing his enemies but also as proof of his sovereign power. The Ibn Aissa affair in particular alarmed the European community in Morocco and they saw it as proof of their perception of Abd al-Hafid as a tyrant. Because of the pressure, Abd al-Hafid freed members of Ibn Aissa's family but despite this, the affair justified increased French intervention in Morocco.

== Treaty of Fes, abdication, retirement and death ==
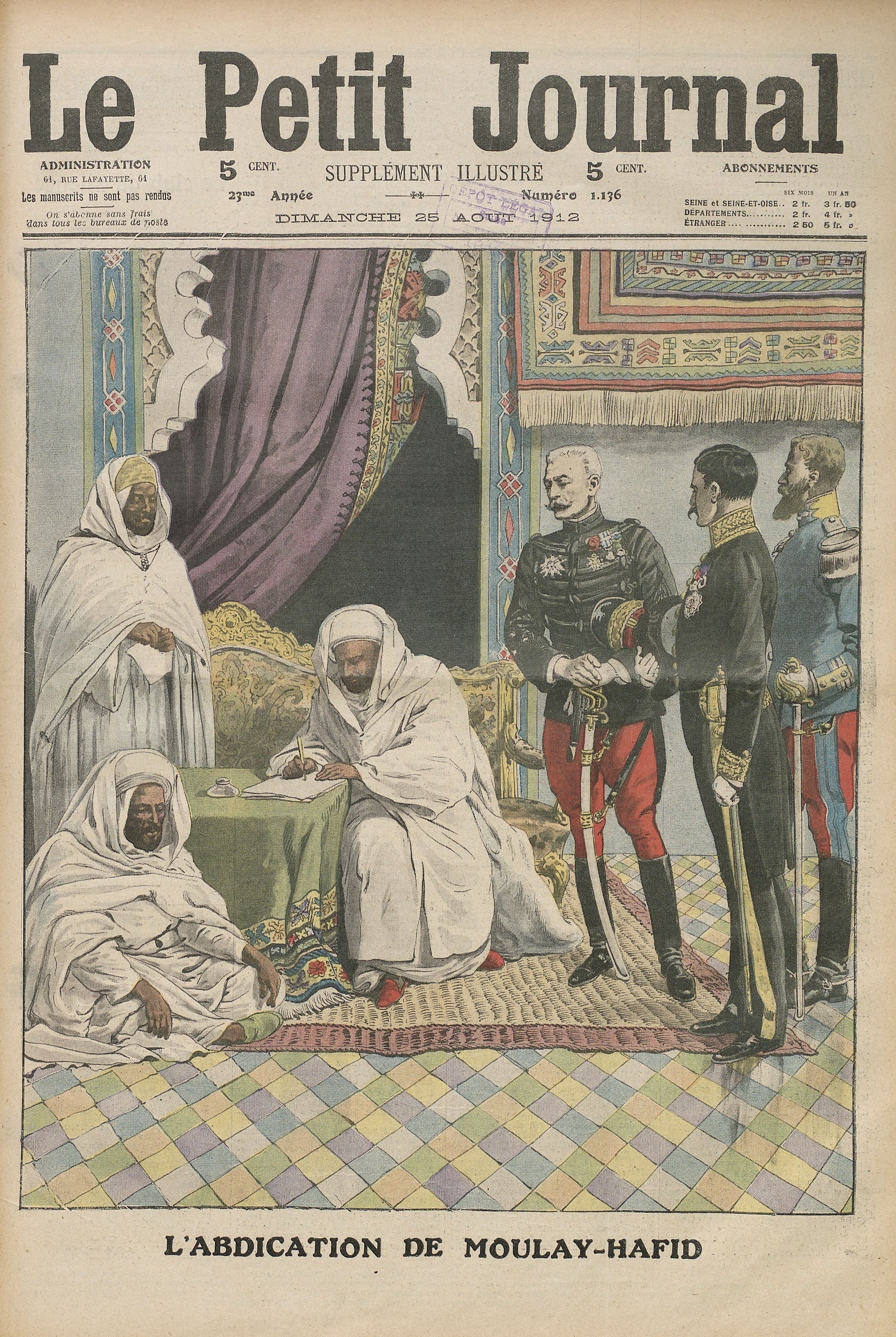
An illustration of Abd al-Hafid signing his act of abdication, on the front page of Le Petit Journal's weekly Supplément illustré, printed 25 August 1912.

In 1911, rebellion broke out against the Sultan. This led to the Agadir Crisis, also known as the Second Moroccan Crisis. These events led Abd al-Hafid to sign the Treaty of Fes on 30 March 1912, which made Morocco a French protectorate.

A few months later, Resident-General Hubert Lyautey persuaded Abd al-Hafid to abdicate against the payment of a massive pension, part of which was used to build the opulent Abdelhafid Palace in Tangier, completed in 1914. His brother Yusef was proclaimed Sultan by the French administration on 13 August 1912. Yusef was chosen by dignitaries of Rabat, to which he soon relocated to escape the instability in Fez. Abd al-Hafid signed his abdication while already on the quay in Rabat, with the ship that would take him to France waiting. During his extended visit in France, he received a great deal of attention from the press. He later returned to Morocco to live in Tangier.

Abd al-Hafid died in Enghien-les-Bains, France, on 4 April 1937. His body was transported to Fez, where he was buried in the royal mausoleum of the Moulay Abdallah Mosque.

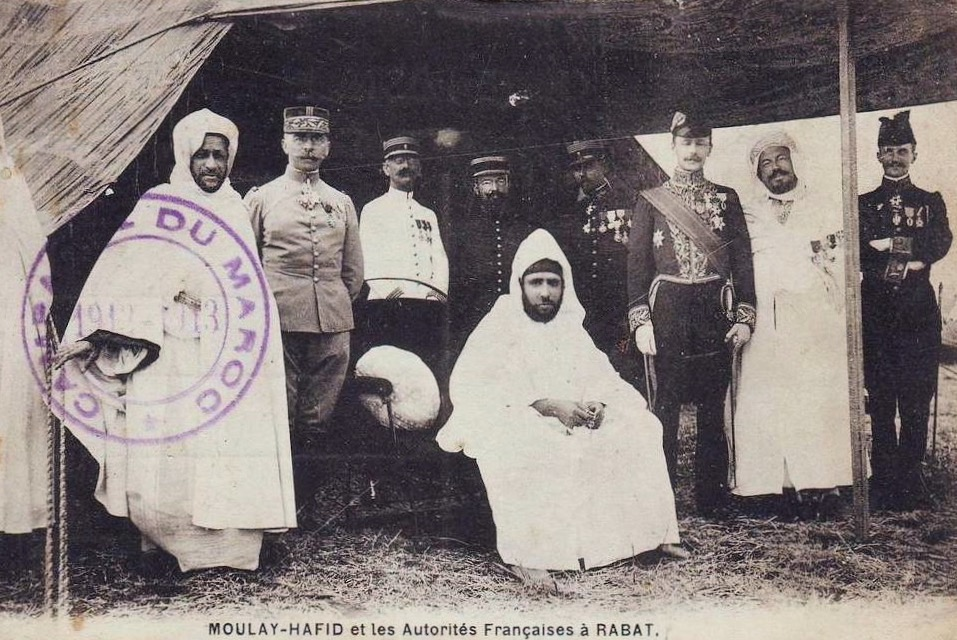
Muhammad al-Muqri, Charles Émile Moinier, Sultan Abd al-Hafid of Morocco, and Si Kaddour Benghabrit, 8 August 1912

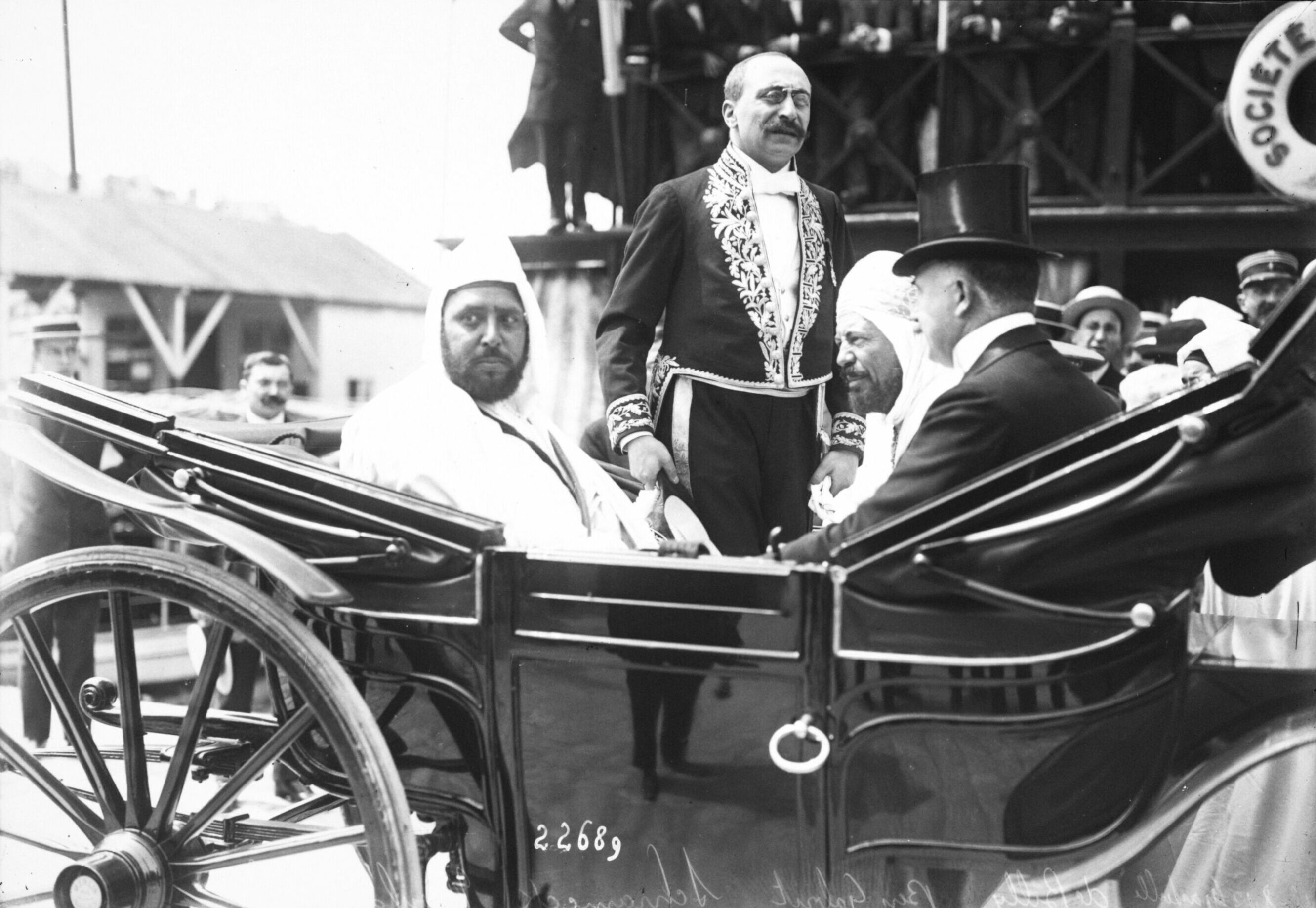
Abd al-Hafid with Abdelqader Ben Ghabrit in Marseille after his abdication 1912

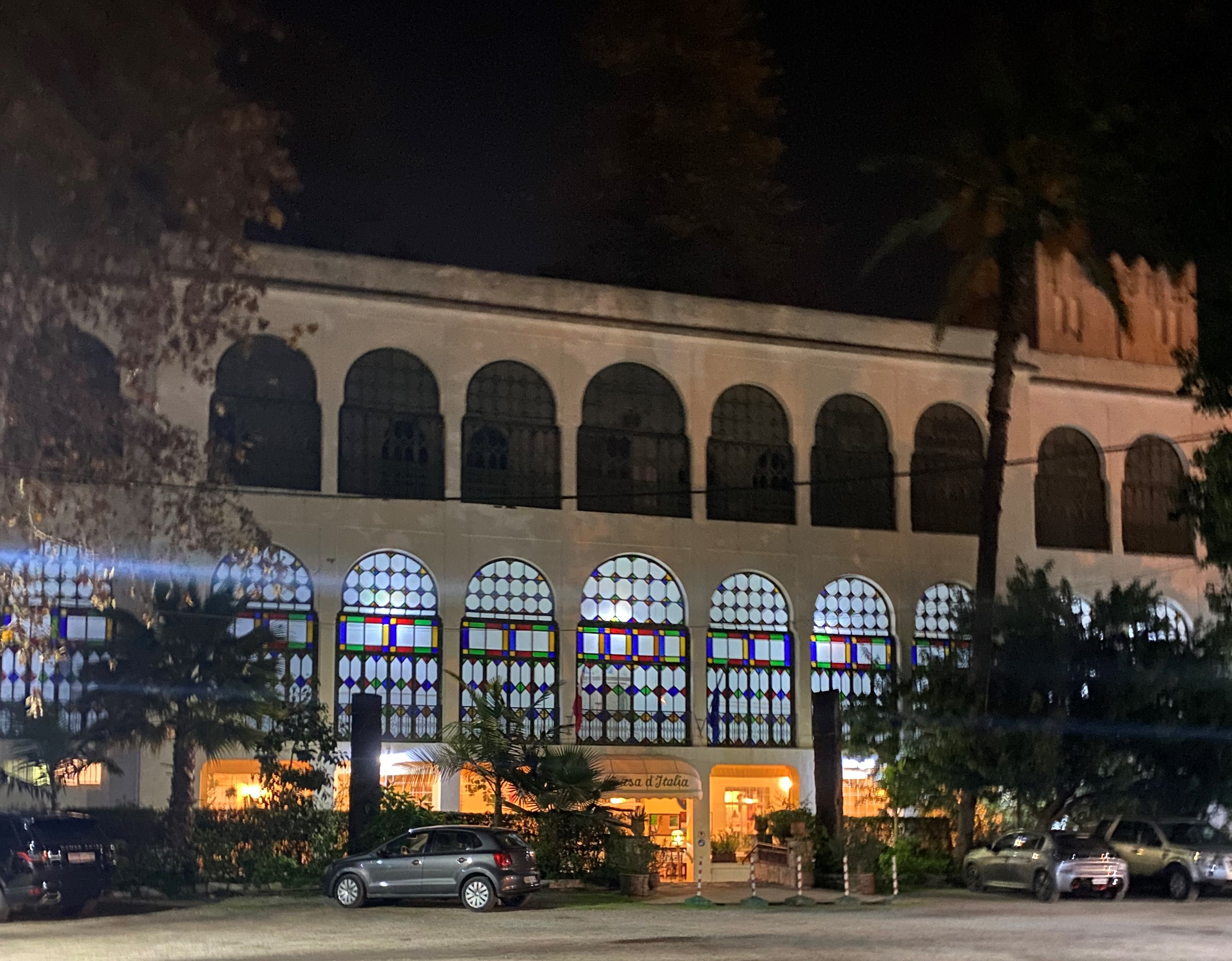
Abdelhafid Palace in Tangier, main facade

== Religion and personality ==
=== Religious beliefs ===
Abd al-Hafid had a reputation as a scholar in Islamic theology and law and he believed that Islam needed "purification" from saint cults and unorthodox religious brotherhoods which he perceived as non-Muslim innovations. When Abd al-Hafid became sultan, under the influence of the Salafiyya movement, he recalled the Moroccan Salafist Abu Shu'ayb ad-Dukkali to become a member of the Royal Learned Council. Under this Salafist influence, he wrote a book against the Sufi orders singling out the Tijaniyya particularly objecting against the claims of the Tijaniyya about Surah al-Fatih arguing their statements amount to kufr (disbelief). Despite being a Salafist, he did not break away completely from the Moroccan Sufi tradition. In May 1906, he started talks with Abu Azzawi who was the head of a Sufi order known for resistance against the French. In 1907, he did a pilgrimage at the brotherhood of Tameslouht and also visited the shrine of the saint Sidi Bel Abbes. This helped prove his legitimacy in the eyes of the Moroccan tribes. Despite this, he did attempt to implement Salafist doctrines and thought that the brotherhoods had a negative effect of the country. He supported the introduction of Salafist ideas into Al-Qarawiyyin Mosque and was a pan-Islamist. After abdicating, he turned to Sufism joining the Tijaniyya and in 1922, he wrote a volume of verse outlining the history of the order and praising the Sufis. It was published in 1930 in Tunis and circulated in Morocco.

=== Personality ===
Unlike Abd al-Aziz, Abd al-Hafid was an intellectual and experienced administrator. He was a poet and wrote a number of books. Furthermore, he was a regular subscriber to the Arabic press from Egypt and the French-backed Arabic newspaper Es-Saada. He had a keen interest in the affairs of the Arab East and also was interested in the rivalries between the European powers. He would also get European newspapers regularly translated to keep up with foreign opinion with Morocco. Being khalifa of Marrakesh meant he learnt how to handle tribal politics and earned the respect of the merchants and religious leaders of Marrakesh. He was capable of being forceful and was dignified and reserved in his public demeanour. However, he had a cruel streak, was greedy, engaged in private self indulgence and was extremely nervous. His negative qualities were exacerbated by the pressure of leadership.

== Legacy and honors ==
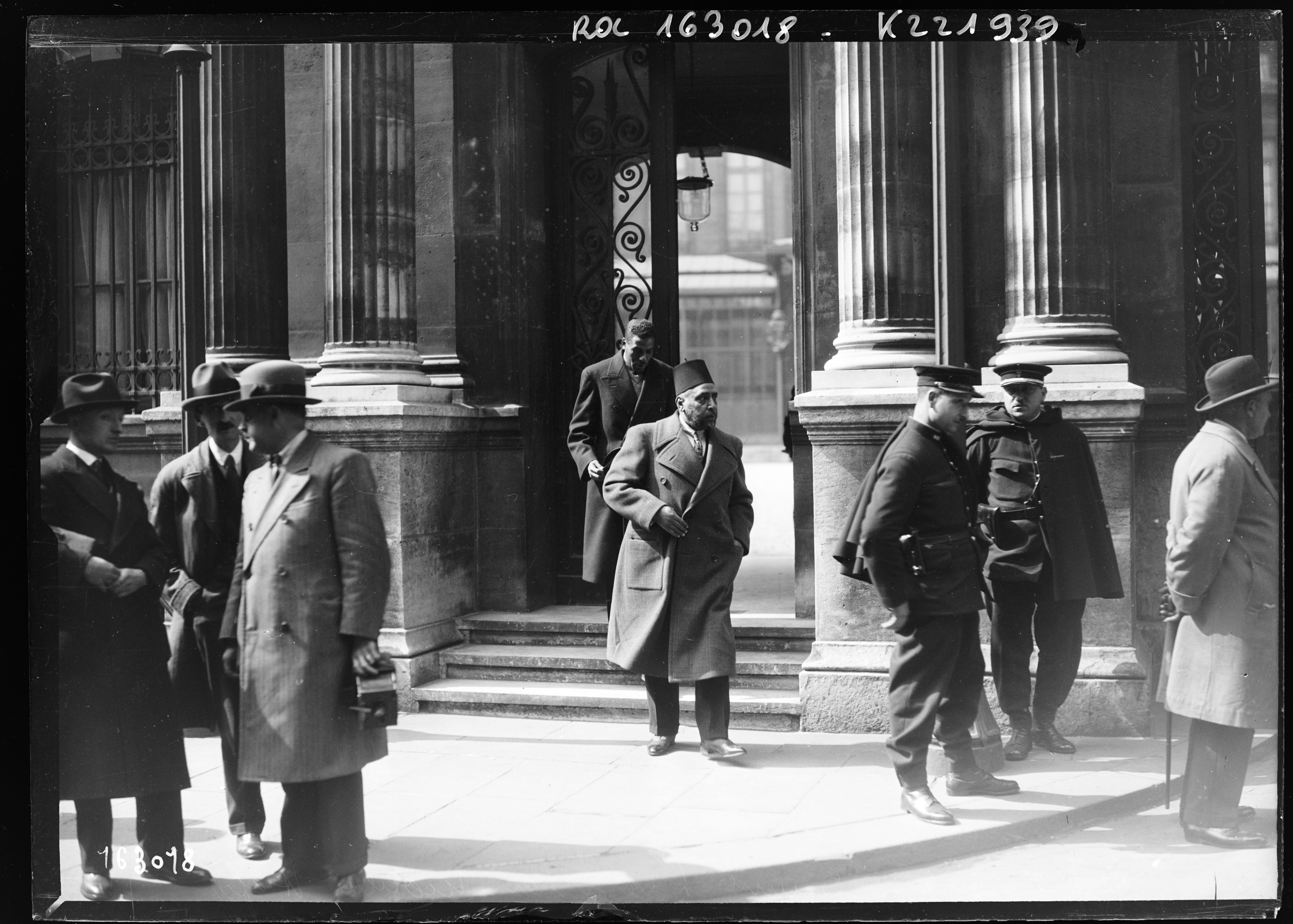
Abd al-Hafid in 1932 at the Élysée Palace after the death of Paul Doumer

Later Moroccan nationalists had a negative view of Abd al-Hafid because of his bargaining with the French over the terms of his abdication and willingness to sign the Treaty of Fes.

Berber tribes in the Middle Atlas like the Ait Ndhir were involved in the Hafidiya with poems commenting on the tribes' hopes about Abd al-Hafid who passed through their territory. After his signing of the Treaty of Fes, they expressed disillusionment with him. Ait Ndhir poet Lyazid u Lahsen, for example, said:

Mawlay Hafiz came and we welcomed him.
He promised us that once he arrived in Fes, he would call on the Muslims for help.
But, when he settled in, he called on the chiefs of the Haouz to be his counselors.
O Morocco [l-Gherb]! He had already sold you to the irumin!

=== International state Honors ===
- Grand Cross of the Legion d'Honneur of France (1909)

== Marriages and children ==
Abd al-Hafid married 4 women from influential families in one night. Some of the women he married included:

1. Lalla Rabia, daughter of Madani el Glaoui. She died in 1924. Together, they had two sons and one daughter including:
  - Lalla Mina. In her first marriage, she married Moulay Hassan ben Yusef and in her second marriage, she married Moulay Lafchar el Alaoui.
2. Rabha, daughter of Mouha ou Hammou Zayani.
3. Lalla Ruqiya, daughter of Mohammed al-Moqri. Later married Sultan Yusef. Together they had:
  - Moulay Slimane Hafidi.

He also had a son, Moulay Idris (b. 1907–1908), who was considered as a potential successor to replace Abd al-Hafid as Sultan by the French.

== See also ==
- List of Kings of Morocco
- History of Morocco

== Sources ==
- Burke III, Edmund (1976). Prelude to Protectorate in Morocco: Pre-Colonial Protest and Resistance, 1860-1912. University of Chicago Press. ISBN 978-0-226-08084-0.
- Pennell, C. R. (2000). Morocco Since 1830: A History. Hurst. ISBN 978-1-85065-273-1.
- Gershovich, Moshe (2012). French Military Rule in Morocco: Colonialism and its Consequences. Routledge. ISBN 978-1-136-32587-8.

| Preceded by Abdelaziz | Sultan of Morocco; 1908–1912 | Succeeded by Ahmed al-Hiba |
