= Edmund Burke III =

American historian (born 1940)

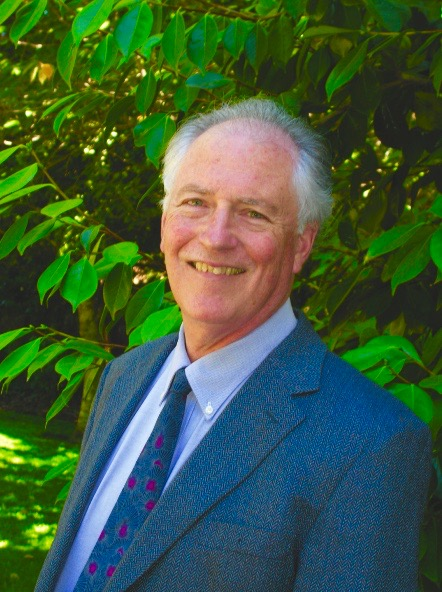
- Edmund Burke III
- Born: 1940 (age 85–86)
- Known for: Research on Islamic history, orientalism, and imperialism
- Awards: Presidential Chair at UC Santa Cruz (2003–2007)

Academic background
- Education: Princeton University (PhD)

Academic work
- Discipline: History
- Sub-discipline: Islamic history, Middle Eastern history, North African history, Mediterranean history, French history, Orientalism, European imperialism
- Institutions: University of California, Santa Cruz
- Notable works: Islam and World History: The Ventures of Marshall Hodgson, The Ethnographic State: France and the Invention of Moroccan Islam

Edmund Burke III (born 1940) is Professor Emeritus of history at the University of California, Santa Cruz. His research areas include Islamic history, modern Middle Eastern and North African history, Mediterranean history, French history, orientalism, European imperialism, and world history. From 2003–2007 he was presidential chair and director of the Center for World History. He received his PhD from Princeton University.

== Publications ==
- Islam and World History: The Ventures of Marshall Hodgson. University of Chicago Press. 2018.
- The Ethnographic State: France and the Invention of Moroccan Islam. University of California Press. 2014.
- Prochaska, D., ed. (2008). Genealogies of Orientalism: History, Theory, Politics. University of Nebraska Press.
- Yaghoubian, D., ed. (2005). Struggle and Survival in the Modern Middle East (2nd ed.). Berkeley: University of California Press.
- "The Deep History of the Middle Eastern Environment, 1500 BCE–1500 CE". UC World History Workshop. Essays and Positions from the World History Workshop. Paper 3. April 27, 2005.
- "Theorizing the Histories of Colonialism and Nationalism in North Africa: Beyond Colonialism and Nationalism in North Africa". Arab Studies Quarterly. 24 Hour Scholar. Spring 1998.
- "Collective Action and Discursive Shifts: A Comparative Historical Perspective". UC eScholarship Repository.
- "Orientalism and World History: Representing Middle Eastern Nationalism and Islamism in the Twentieth Century". UC eScholarship Repository.
