= Muhammad al-Muqri =

Moroccan politician (died 1957)

Hajj Muhammad al-Muqri
- محمد المقري
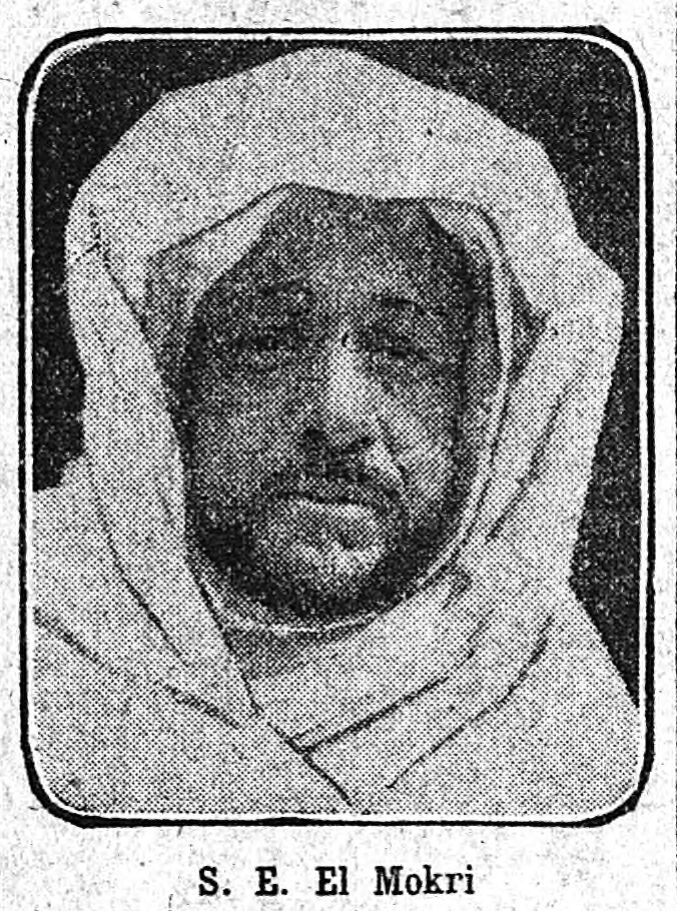
- Muhammad al-Muqri on the front page of Le Petit Journal August 8, 1925

Grand Vizier of Morocco
- In office 1917 – 17 October 1955
- Monarchs: Yusef; Mohammed V
- Preceded by: M'hammed El Guebbas
- Succeeded by: Mbarek Bekkay (as Prime Minister)
- In office 14 November 1911 – 1913
- Monarchs: Abd al-Hafid; Yusef
- Preceded by: Madani El Glaoui
- Succeeded by: M'hammed El Guebbas

Minister of finance
- In office 1908–1911
- Monarch: Abd al-Hafid

Personal details
- Born: 2 February 1854 or 1860 Oujda, Morocco
- Died: 9 September 1957 (aged 103 or 96–97) Rabat, Morocco

Haj Muhammad Ben Abd as-Salam al-Muqri (Arabic: الحاج محمد بن عبد السلام المقري, 2 February 1854 or 1860 – 9 September 1957), alternatively transcribed as Mohammed El Mokri, was a senior Moroccan official of the late 19th and early 20th century. He was an adviser and grand vizier to several sultans of Morocco, including under French colonial domination.

== Early life ==
Muhammad Al-Muqri was born on 2 February 1854 or 1860, in Oujda to Abd as-Salam al-Muqri (1830–1903), who held the position of Lamin of Sultan Hasan I, and a Fassi woman from the Zghari family. His paternal grandfather, al-Haj al-Madani al-Muqri (1807–1890), immigrated to Fez from Tlemcen in the early 19th-century. This family became a well-known family whose descendants successively held government portfolios in Morocco.

== Career ==
He began his career in government during the reign of Muhammad IV of Morocco, the father of Hassan I of Morocco. During this period of time, al-Muqri is alleged to have attended the opening of the Suez Canal where he met with Emperor Napoleon III and Empress Eugénie in 1869. After the death of Hassan I, sultan, Abd al-Aziz seized the throne.

=== Algeciras Conference ===
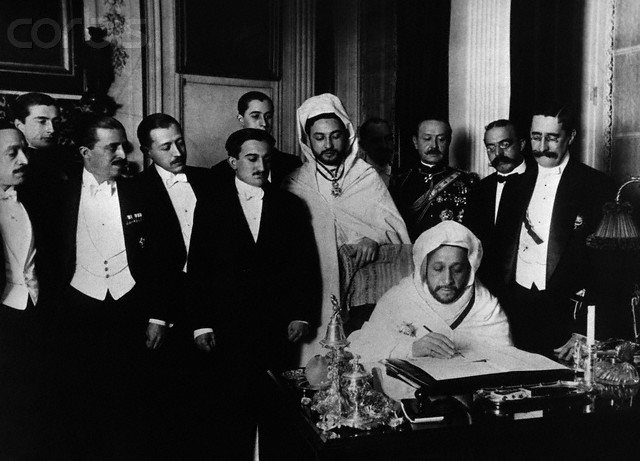
al-Muqri signing the Treaty of Algeciras in 1906.

At that time, Al Muqri was the country's representative to the 1906 Algeciras Conference at which Germany's demand for a say in Moroccan affairs was rejected in favor of France and Spain. In recognition of his efforts to resolve the Moroccan Crisis leading up to the international conference, Abd al-Aziz appointed al-Muqri as his Minister of Finance and in 1908, his Sadr A'adham (صدر أعظم) or Grand Vizier, a post he would hold on and off under each of the succeeding sultans until 1955.

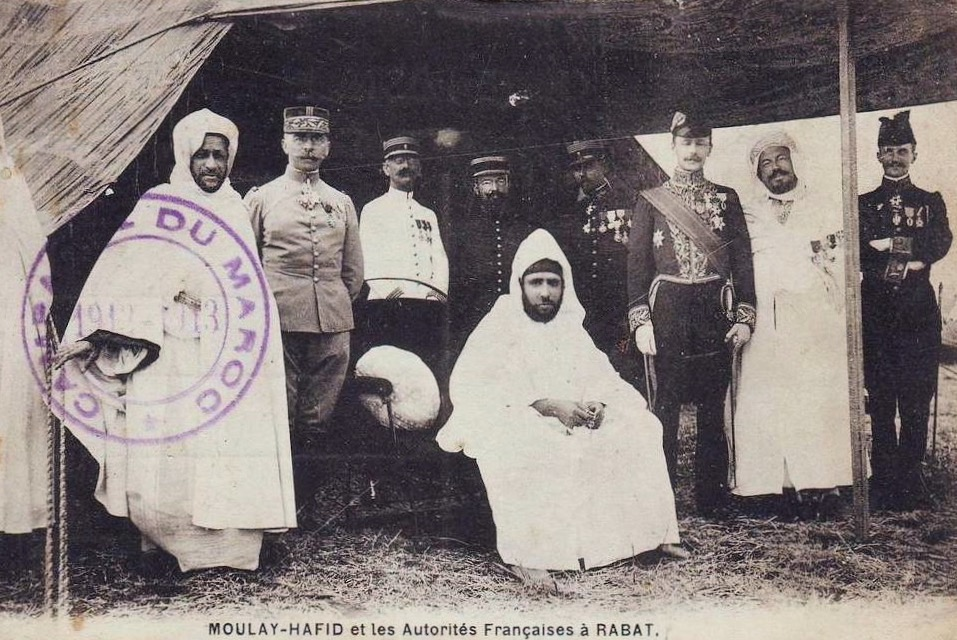
Muhammad al-Muqri, Charles Émile Moinier, Sultan Abd al-Hafid of Morocco, and Abdelqader Benghabrit, 8 August 1912.

In 1909, the new sultan Abd Al-Hafid demoted him to the post of Minister of Finance but promoted him again to Grand Vizier in 1911. Al-Muqri resigned the post two years later, but was reappointed to it by Sultan Yusef, and was kept in the position by his successor, Sultan Muhammad ben Youssef, when he ascended the throne in 1927. In 1953, when Muhammad ben Youssef was deposed by the French for nationalist agitation and replaced by his uncle, the French puppet monarch Mohammed Ben Aarafa, the colonial authorities decided to keep al-Muqri in his position. Once independence was promised, Ben Arafa abdicated, and al-Muqri was chosen by colonial authorities to head the Regency, among other dignitaries such as Pacha Fatmi Benslimane, until the exiled Sultan Muhammad could return to the country and assume the throne.

== Death ==
Al-Muqri (sometimes spelled El Mokri) left politics in 1955, shortly before Morocco gained its independence. He died two years later, "penniless and dishonored" for having backed Mohammed Ben Aarafa. He was purportedly a centenarian.

== Legacy ==
After his death his residence in Rabat (known as Dar el Mokri) became an infamous location of detention and torture in the 1950s, 60s and up to the 1970s, during what was termed as the Years of Lead.

== Family ==
Muhammad al-Muqri married three women (one Algerian and two Moroccan) with whom he had five sons and a daughter, all born during 1890–1900:

- Taieb al-Moqri, Pasha of Casablanca and Minister of finance.
- Hammed al-Moqri (حماد), Khalifa of the Pasha of Fes.
- Tahar al-Moqri, Pasha of Safi and head of the customs of Casablanca (studied in France).
- Mokhtar al-Moqri, Pasha and head of the customs of Tangier (studied in France).
- Thami al-Moqri, Minister of Finance and first agricultural engineer of Morocco.
- Ruqaya al-Moqri, married Sultan Moulay Hafid then his brother Moulay Youssef.
- Zineb al-Moqri, married Madani El Glaoui, grand vizier, then his brother Thami El Glaoui, Pacha of Marrakech.

== Longevity claim ==
It is claimed that al-Moqri died at the reputed age of 112, according to the Guinness Book of World Records, or even of 116, according to other sources. Both figures are doubtful. There are no birth records or other evidence for these claims. It is rare to attain such an age and unheard of to be head of government at 110 or 114. John Gunther's book Inside Africa (published 1955) says he was born in 1851: other sources list his birth year as 1854. Vermeren gives 1860. The Britannica Book of the Year gives his birthdate as February 1841.

== See also ==
- Dar Moqri
