= Dar Adiyel =

Historic house in Fes, Morocco

- دار الديال
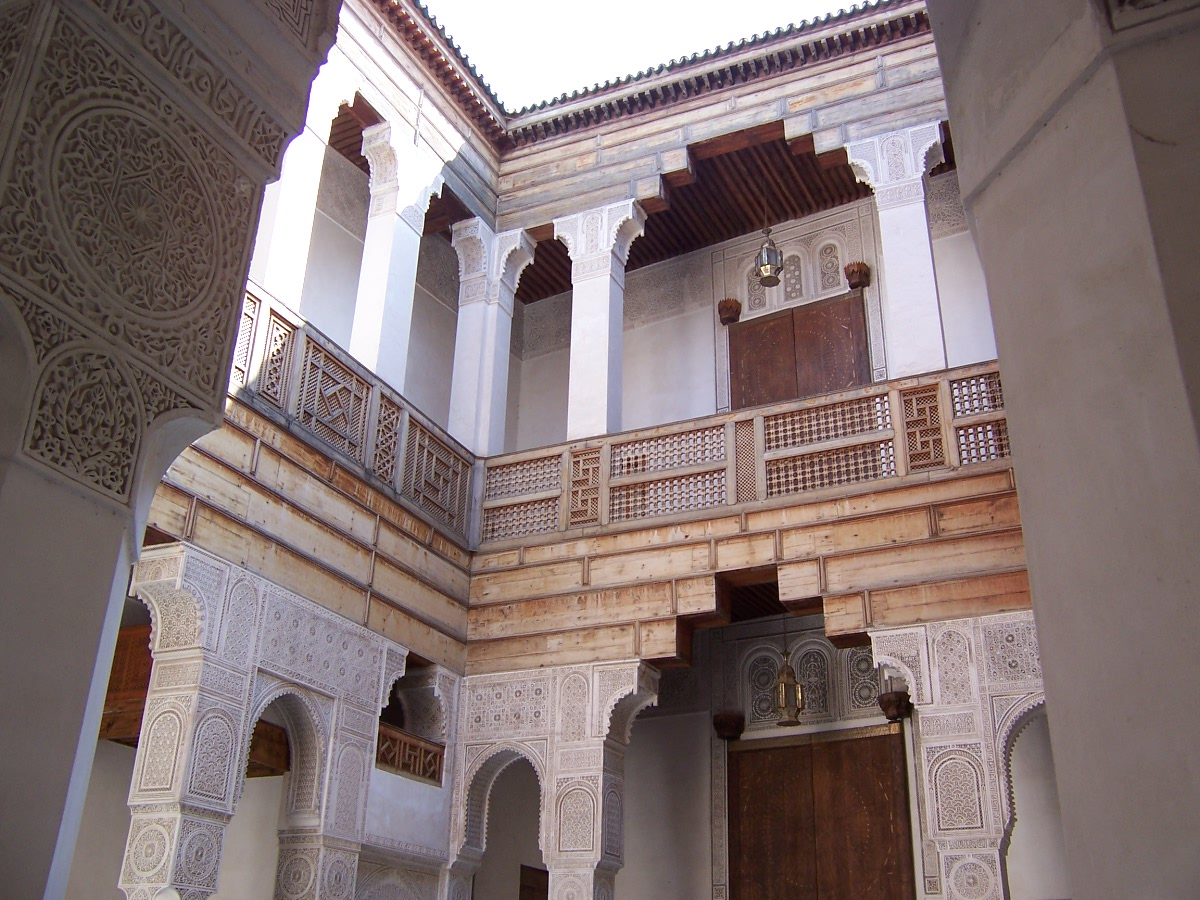
- Interior of Dar Adiyel
- Interactive map of the Dar Adiyel area

General information
- Type: palace, riad
- Architectural style: Moroccan, Moorish architecture
- Location: Fes, Morocco

Technical details
- Material: wood, brick, tile
- Floor count: 1

Dar Adiyel or Dar 'Adiyil is a historic mansion in Fes el-Bali, the old medina of Fes, Morocco. It is located in the Zqaq el-Bghal neighbourhood, a short distance south from Tala'a Seghira street.

== History ==
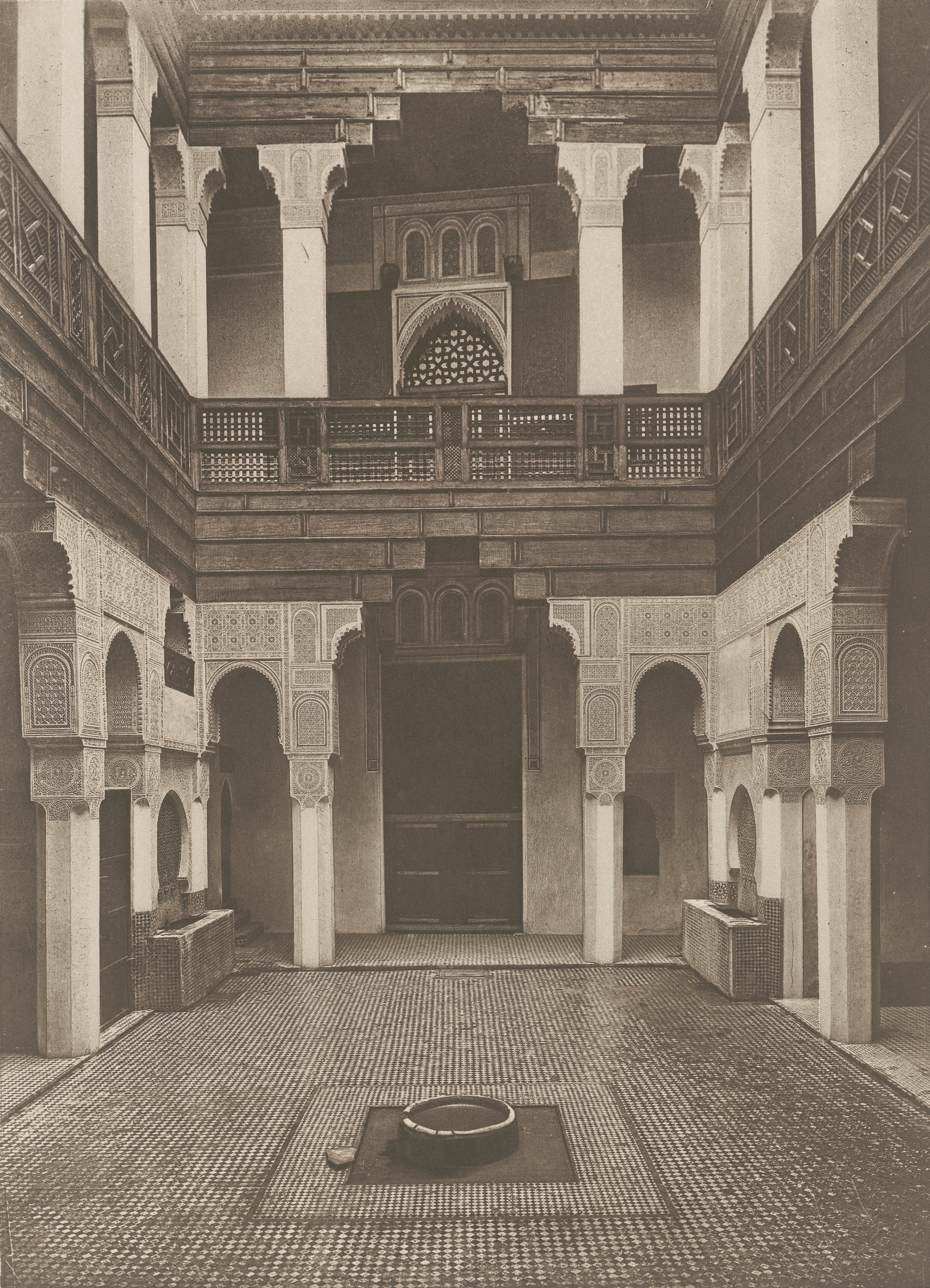
Courtyard of the Dar Adiyel (1921 photo)

The exact date of the house's construction is unknown, but it was built sometime in the late 17th or early 18th centuries. The house is named after one of its earliest owners, Abd al-Khaliq 'Adiyil. He was a rich merchant who was an amin (provost or magistrate) in Fes under the Alaouite sultan Moulay Ismail (ruled 1672–1727) and then became governor of the city under his son, Sultan Moulay Abdallah (ruled 1729–1734). 'Adiyil was also responsible for the construction of the Funduq al-Najjarin to the east. After he died in 1747 the house became the property of the government and in the 19th century it was used as an office of the state treasury. Coins were struck here for the city and revenues from indirect taxation were collected here before being passed on to the central treasury.

At the establishment of the French Protectorate over Morocco in 1912 the house became the regional headquarters of the Service des Arts indigènes ("Service/Office of the Native Arts"), which oversaw the study and preservation of historic heritage, under the direction of Alfred Bel at the time. Its ground floor also served as the first Museum of Native Arts (Musée d'Arts indigènes), before this role was transferred to Dar Batha (the current historic art museum of Fes) in 1915. The house continued to serve as an office for this agency under its two subsequent directors, Prosper Ricard and Marcel Vicaire. It later became a conservatory of Andalusian music before falling into neglect in the 1980s.

The house has recently been restored in cooperation with UNESCO and with funding from the Italian government. Since then it has resumed its function as a music conservatory and in recent years has served as one of the venues for the World Sacred Music Festival of Fes.

== Architecture ==
The house is considered one of the most beautiful and well-preserved examples of domestic architecture in Fes, with architectural similarities to houses of the earlier Saadian and Marinid periods. It has two stories and, like many traditional Moroccan houses, is centered around a main courtyard. It is entered via a bent passage from the street which leads directly to the courtyard. The courtyard, as the centerpiece of the house, is elegantly arranged and richly decorated. At its middle is a fountain and around its sides runs a two-story gallery. The gallery is highlighted with wooden elements and stucco decoration, as well as zellij-decorated wall fountains between some of its pillars. On both the ground floor and the upper floor there are four rooms arranged around the courtyard and accessed from the gallery.

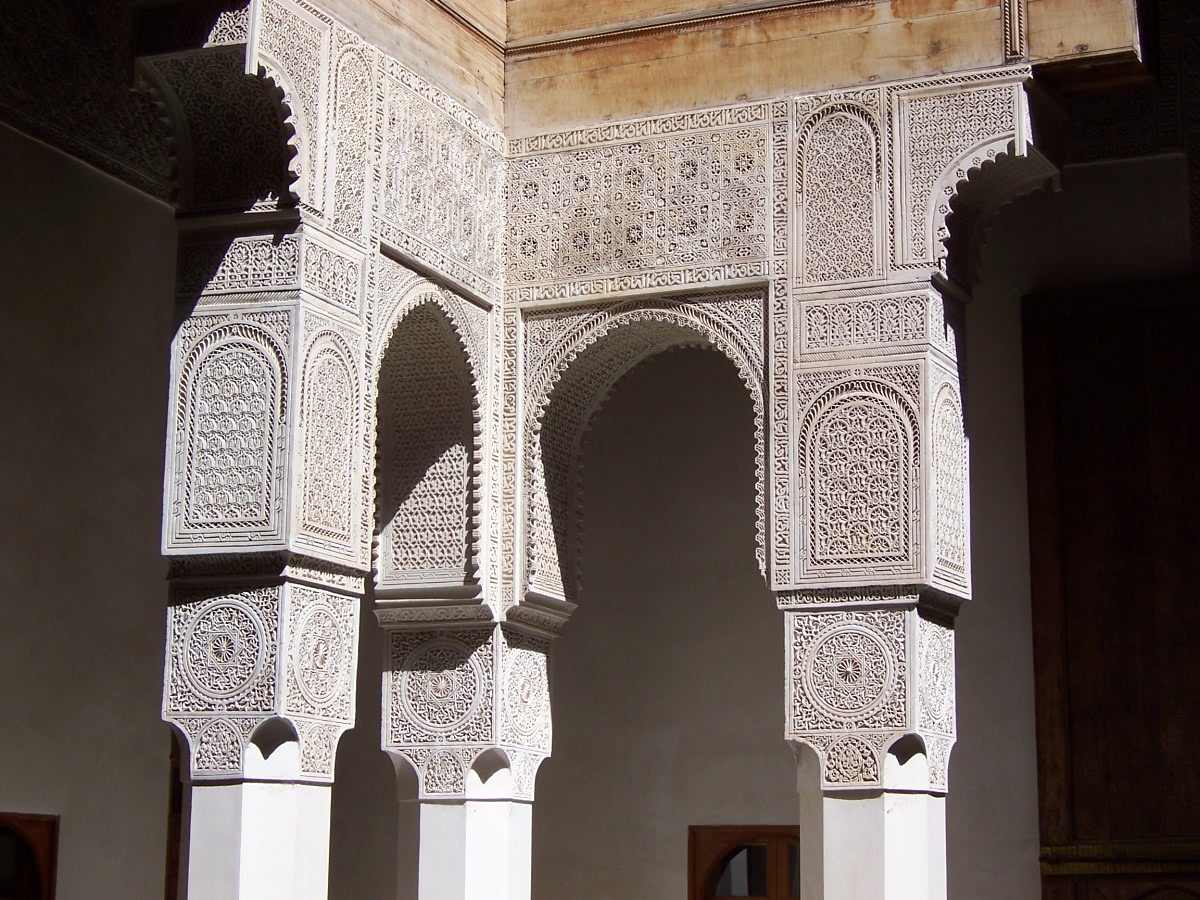
Stucco decoration in the courtyard

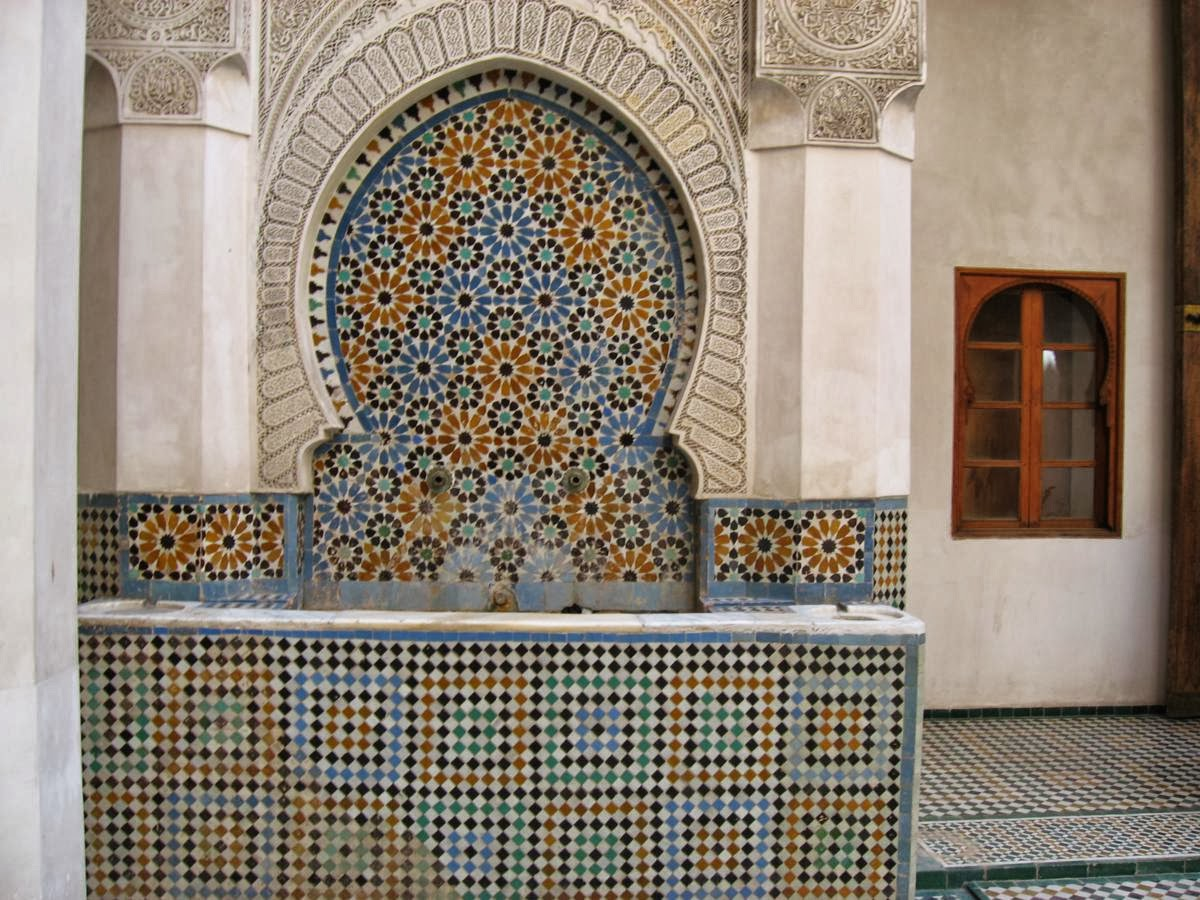
One of the fountains in the gallery of the courtyard of the house
